

129001–129100 

|-bgcolor=#E9E9E9
| 129001 ||  || — || October 7, 2004 || Socorro || LINEAR || — || align=right | 6.0 km || 
|-id=002 bgcolor=#d6d6d6
| 129002 ||  || — || October 9, 2004 || Kitt Peak || Spacewatch || HIL3:2 || align=right | 7.2 km || 
|-id=003 bgcolor=#E9E9E9
| 129003 ||  || — || October 9, 2004 || Kitt Peak || Spacewatch || — || align=right | 4.0 km || 
|-id=004 bgcolor=#E9E9E9
| 129004 ||  || — || October 9, 2004 || Socorro || LINEAR || — || align=right | 1.5 km || 
|-id=005 bgcolor=#E9E9E9
| 129005 ||  || — || October 10, 2004 || Kitt Peak || Spacewatch || — || align=right | 2.0 km || 
|-id=006 bgcolor=#E9E9E9
| 129006 ||  || — || October 10, 2004 || Kitt Peak || Spacewatch || — || align=right | 3.2 km || 
|-id=007 bgcolor=#d6d6d6
| 129007 ||  || — || October 10, 2004 || Kitt Peak || Spacewatch || 3:2 || align=right | 5.1 km || 
|-id=008 bgcolor=#d6d6d6
| 129008 ||  || — || October 10, 2004 || Kitt Peak || Spacewatch || — || align=right | 3.8 km || 
|-id=009 bgcolor=#d6d6d6
| 129009 ||  || — || October 9, 2004 || Socorro || LINEAR || KOR || align=right | 2.3 km || 
|-id=010 bgcolor=#E9E9E9
| 129010 ||  || — || October 9, 2004 || Kitt Peak || Spacewatch || — || align=right | 1.4 km || 
|-id=011 bgcolor=#d6d6d6
| 129011 ||  || — || October 10, 2004 || Socorro || LINEAR || — || align=right | 4.9 km || 
|-id=012 bgcolor=#fefefe
| 129012 ||  || — || October 10, 2004 || Socorro || LINEAR || V || align=right | 1.3 km || 
|-id=013 bgcolor=#d6d6d6
| 129013 ||  || — || October 10, 2004 || Socorro || LINEAR || EOS || align=right | 3.7 km || 
|-id=014 bgcolor=#E9E9E9
| 129014 ||  || — || October 11, 2004 || Kitt Peak || Spacewatch || — || align=right | 3.7 km || 
|-id=015 bgcolor=#d6d6d6
| 129015 ||  || — || October 11, 2004 || Palomar || NEAT || — || align=right | 6.0 km || 
|-id=016 bgcolor=#E9E9E9
| 129016 ||  || — || October 11, 2004 || Kitt Peak || Spacewatch || AGN || align=right | 1.8 km || 
|-id=017 bgcolor=#d6d6d6
| 129017 ||  || — || October 11, 2004 || Kitt Peak || Spacewatch || — || align=right | 4.3 km || 
|-id=018 bgcolor=#d6d6d6
| 129018 ||  || — || October 11, 2004 || Kitt Peak || Spacewatch || KOR || align=right | 2.2 km || 
|-id=019 bgcolor=#d6d6d6
| 129019 ||  || — || October 13, 2004 || Kitt Peak || Spacewatch || — || align=right | 4.4 km || 
|-id=020 bgcolor=#fefefe
| 129020 ||  || — || October 4, 2004 || Palomar || NEAT || V || align=right | 1.3 km || 
|-id=021 bgcolor=#E9E9E9
| 129021 ||  || — || October 9, 2004 || Socorro || LINEAR || — || align=right | 2.5 km || 
|-id=022 bgcolor=#fefefe
| 129022 ||  || — || October 10, 2004 || Kitt Peak || Spacewatch || MAS || align=right | 1.3 km || 
|-id=023 bgcolor=#d6d6d6
| 129023 ||  || — || October 10, 2004 || Kitt Peak || Spacewatch || — || align=right | 3.4 km || 
|-id=024 bgcolor=#d6d6d6
| 129024 ||  || — || October 12, 2004 || Anderson Mesa || LONEOS || — || align=right | 5.7 km || 
|-id=025 bgcolor=#d6d6d6
| 129025 ||  || — || October 14, 2004 || Kitt Peak || Spacewatch || — || align=right | 3.9 km || 
|-id=026 bgcolor=#d6d6d6
| 129026 Conormcmenamin ||  ||  || October 15, 2004 || Mount Lemmon || Mount Lemmon Survey || — || align=right | 6.6 km || 
|-id=027 bgcolor=#d6d6d6
| 129027 ||  || — || October 15, 2004 || Haleakala || NEAT || MEL || align=right | 6.3 km || 
|-id=028 bgcolor=#fefefe
| 129028 ||  || — || October 15, 2004 || Anderson Mesa || LONEOS || — || align=right | 1.4 km || 
|-id=029 bgcolor=#fefefe
| 129029 ||  || — || October 7, 2004 || Kitt Peak || Spacewatch || V || align=right | 1.1 km || 
|-id=030 bgcolor=#d6d6d6
| 129030 ||  || — || October 9, 2004 || Socorro || LINEAR || — || align=right | 4.2 km || 
|-id=031 bgcolor=#d6d6d6
| 129031 ||  || — || October 9, 2004 || Kitt Peak || Spacewatch || KOR || align=right | 2.4 km || 
|-id=032 bgcolor=#d6d6d6
| 129032 ||  || — || October 14, 2004 || Anderson Mesa || LONEOS || — || align=right | 9.3 km || 
|-id=033 bgcolor=#E9E9E9
| 129033 ||  || — || October 14, 2004 || Anderson Mesa || LONEOS || ADE || align=right | 4.4 km || 
|-id=034 bgcolor=#E9E9E9
| 129034 ||  || — || October 10, 2004 || Socorro || LINEAR || — || align=right | 4.0 km || 
|-id=035 bgcolor=#E9E9E9
| 129035 ||  || — || October 18, 2004 || Socorro || LINEAR || — || align=right | 4.9 km || 
|-id=036 bgcolor=#d6d6d6
| 129036 ||  || — || October 16, 2004 || Socorro || LINEAR || — || align=right | 6.5 km || 
|-id=037 bgcolor=#d6d6d6
| 129037 ||  || — || October 16, 2004 || Socorro || LINEAR || URS || align=right | 4.9 km || 
|-id=038 bgcolor=#E9E9E9
| 129038 ||  || — || October 16, 2004 || Socorro || LINEAR || TIN || align=right | 3.4 km || 
|-id=039 bgcolor=#d6d6d6
| 129039 ||  || — || October 18, 2004 || Socorro || LINEAR || EOS || align=right | 3.4 km || 
|-id=040 bgcolor=#d6d6d6
| 129040 ||  || — || October 20, 2004 || Socorro || LINEAR || EOS || align=right | 3.5 km || 
|-id=041 bgcolor=#d6d6d6
| 129041 ||  || — || October 21, 2004 || Socorro || LINEAR || HYG || align=right | 4.5 km || 
|-id=042 bgcolor=#d6d6d6
| 129042 ||  || — || November 2, 2004 || Anderson Mesa || LONEOS || — || align=right | 7.1 km || 
|-id=043 bgcolor=#fefefe
| 129043 ||  || — || November 3, 2004 || Kitt Peak || Spacewatch || FLO || align=right | 1.2 km || 
|-id=044 bgcolor=#d6d6d6
| 129044 ||  || — || November 3, 2004 || Kitt Peak || Spacewatch || — || align=right | 5.0 km || 
|-id=045 bgcolor=#E9E9E9
| 129045 ||  || — || November 3, 2004 || Anderson Mesa || LONEOS || — || align=right | 2.4 km || 
|-id=046 bgcolor=#d6d6d6
| 129046 ||  || — || November 3, 2004 || Anderson Mesa || LONEOS || — || align=right | 6.0 km || 
|-id=047 bgcolor=#d6d6d6
| 129047 ||  || — || November 3, 2004 || Anderson Mesa || LONEOS || NAE || align=right | 5.4 km || 
|-id=048 bgcolor=#d6d6d6
| 129048 ||  || — || November 3, 2004 || Kitt Peak || Spacewatch || — || align=right | 4.7 km || 
|-id=049 bgcolor=#fefefe
| 129049 ||  || — || November 3, 2004 || Kitt Peak || Spacewatch || — || align=right | 1.3 km || 
|-id=050 bgcolor=#E9E9E9
| 129050 Lowellcogburn ||  ||  || November 3, 2004 || Catalina || CSS || — || align=right | 2.1 km || 
|-id=051 bgcolor=#d6d6d6
| 129051 Chrismay ||  ||  || November 3, 2004 || Catalina || CSS || — || align=right | 5.2 km || 
|-id=052 bgcolor=#d6d6d6
| 129052 Nîmeshdave ||  ||  || November 3, 2004 || Catalina || CSS || — || align=right | 6.5 km || 
|-id=053 bgcolor=#d6d6d6
| 129053 Derekshannon ||  ||  || November 3, 2004 || Catalina || CSS || — || align=right | 6.8 km || 
|-id=054 bgcolor=#E9E9E9
| 129054 ||  || — || November 1, 2004 || Palomar || NEAT || — || align=right | 3.8 km || 
|-id=055 bgcolor=#d6d6d6
| 129055 ||  || — || November 5, 2004 || Palomar || NEAT || — || align=right | 2.4 km || 
|-id=056 bgcolor=#d6d6d6
| 129056 ||  || — || November 3, 2004 || Kitt Peak || Spacewatch || — || align=right | 3.8 km || 
|-id=057 bgcolor=#d6d6d6
| 129057 ||  || — || November 4, 2004 || Kitt Peak || Spacewatch || KOR || align=right | 2.3 km || 
|-id=058 bgcolor=#fefefe
| 129058 ||  || — || November 4, 2004 || Kitt Peak || Spacewatch || — || align=right | 1.7 km || 
|-id=059 bgcolor=#d6d6d6
| 129059 ||  || — || November 4, 2004 || Kitt Peak || Spacewatch || TIR || align=right | 5.3 km || 
|-id=060 bgcolor=#d6d6d6
| 129060 Huntskretsch ||  ||  || November 4, 2004 || Catalina || CSS || — || align=right | 5.1 km || 
|-id=061 bgcolor=#d6d6d6
| 129061 Karlfortney ||  ||  || November 4, 2004 || Catalina || CSS || EOS || align=right | 3.1 km || 
|-id=062 bgcolor=#E9E9E9
| 129062 ||  || — || November 4, 2004 || Anderson Mesa || LONEOS || — || align=right | 4.4 km || 
|-id=063 bgcolor=#d6d6d6
| 129063 Joshwood ||  ||  || November 4, 2004 || Catalina || CSS || EOS || align=right | 4.4 km || 
|-id=064 bgcolor=#d6d6d6
| 129064 Jeanneladewig ||  ||  || November 4, 2004 || Catalina || CSS || — || align=right | 5.2 km || 
|-id=065 bgcolor=#d6d6d6
| 129065 ||  || — || November 5, 2004 || Palomar || NEAT || EOS || align=right | 3.8 km || 
|-id=066 bgcolor=#d6d6d6
| 129066 ||  || — || November 7, 2004 || Wrightwood || J. W. Young || THM || align=right | 3.7 km || 
|-id=067 bgcolor=#fefefe
| 129067 ||  || — || November 3, 2004 || Kitt Peak || Spacewatch || NYS || align=right | 1.2 km || 
|-id=068 bgcolor=#d6d6d6
| 129068 Alexmay ||  ||  || November 4, 2004 || Catalina || CSS || — || align=right | 4.1 km || 
|-id=069 bgcolor=#d6d6d6
| 129069 ||  || — || November 5, 2004 || Palomar || NEAT || — || align=right | 4.3 km || 
|-id=070 bgcolor=#d6d6d6
| 129070 ||  || — || November 7, 2004 || Socorro || LINEAR || EOS || align=right | 3.3 km || 
|-id=071 bgcolor=#d6d6d6
| 129071 Catriegle ||  ||  || November 3, 2004 || Catalina || CSS || — || align=right | 6.2 km || 
|-id=072 bgcolor=#d6d6d6
| 129072 ||  || — || November 5, 2004 || Socorro || LINEAR || — || align=right | 5.5 km || 
|-id=073 bgcolor=#d6d6d6
| 129073 Sandyfreund ||  ||  || November 9, 2004 || Catalina || CSS || — || align=right | 4.7 km || 
|-id=074 bgcolor=#d6d6d6
| 129074 ||  || — || November 5, 2004 || Palomar || NEAT || — || align=right | 4.2 km || 
|-id=075 bgcolor=#d6d6d6
| 129075 ||  || — || November 6, 2004 || Socorro || LINEAR || — || align=right | 6.6 km || 
|-id=076 bgcolor=#d6d6d6
| 129076 ||  || — || November 6, 2004 || Socorro || LINEAR || — || align=right | 5.3 km || 
|-id=077 bgcolor=#d6d6d6
| 129077 ||  || — || November 6, 2004 || Socorro || LINEAR || EOS || align=right | 3.4 km || 
|-id=078 bgcolor=#fefefe
| 129078 Animoo ||  ||  || November 8, 2004 || Vicques || M. Ory || NYS || align=right | 1.5 km || 
|-id=079 bgcolor=#d6d6d6
| 129079 ||  || — || November 7, 2004 || Socorro || LINEAR || 3:2 || align=right | 7.5 km || 
|-id=080 bgcolor=#d6d6d6
| 129080 ||  || — || November 6, 2004 || Socorro || LINEAR || 7:4 || align=right | 7.0 km || 
|-id=081 bgcolor=#d6d6d6
| 129081 ||  || — || November 14, 2004 || Cordell-Lorenz || Cordell–Lorenz Obs. || EOS || align=right | 3.5 km || 
|-id=082 bgcolor=#fefefe
| 129082 Oliviabillett ||  ||  || November 12, 2004 || Catalina || CSS || FLO || align=right | 1.1 km || 
|-id=083 bgcolor=#d6d6d6
| 129083 ||  || — || November 3, 2004 || Anderson Mesa || LONEOS || — || align=right | 5.0 km || 
|-id=084 bgcolor=#d6d6d6
| 129084 ||  || — || November 11, 2004 || Kitt Peak || Spacewatch || — || align=right | 4.9 km || 
|-id=085 bgcolor=#d6d6d6
| 129085 ||  || — || November 11, 2004 || Kitt Peak || Spacewatch || HYG || align=right | 4.7 km || 
|-id=086 bgcolor=#E9E9E9
| 129086 ||  || — || November 11, 2004 || Kitt Peak || Spacewatch || — || align=right | 2.9 km || 
|-id=087 bgcolor=#d6d6d6
| 129087 ||  || — || November 3, 2004 || Kitt Peak || Spacewatch || KOR || align=right | 2.3 km || 
|-id=088 bgcolor=#d6d6d6
| 129088 ||  || — || November 3, 2004 || Anderson Mesa || LONEOS || EOS || align=right | 3.8 km || 
|-id=089 bgcolor=#E9E9E9
| 129089 ||  || — || November 3, 2004 || Palomar || NEAT || HOF || align=right | 4.6 km || 
|-id=090 bgcolor=#d6d6d6
| 129090 || 2004 WB || — || November 17, 2004 || Siding Spring || SSS || VER || align=right | 5.1 km || 
|-id=091 bgcolor=#d6d6d6
| 129091 ||  || — || November 18, 2004 || Socorro || LINEAR || — || align=right | 4.7 km || 
|-id=092 bgcolor=#d6d6d6
| 129092 Snowdonia ||  ||  || November 19, 2004 || Haleakala-Faulkes || Faulkes Project || — || align=right | 3.8 km || 
|-id=093 bgcolor=#d6d6d6
| 129093 ||  || — || November 19, 2004 || Anderson Mesa || LONEOS || URS || align=right | 5.7 km || 
|-id=094 bgcolor=#d6d6d6
| 129094 || 2004 XZ || — || December 1, 2004 || Palomar || NEAT || — || align=right | 5.2 km || 
|-id=095 bgcolor=#E9E9E9
| 129095 Martyschmitzer ||  ||  || December 1, 2004 || Catalina || CSS || — || align=right | 2.7 km || 
|-id=096 bgcolor=#d6d6d6
| 129096 Andrewleung ||  ||  || December 1, 2004 || Catalina || CSS || — || align=right | 3.9 km || 
|-id=097 bgcolor=#d6d6d6
| 129097 ||  || — || December 1, 2004 || Palomar || NEAT || — || align=right | 7.0 km || 
|-id=098 bgcolor=#d6d6d6
| 129098 ||  || — || December 1, 2004 || Palomar || NEAT || — || align=right | 5.6 km || 
|-id=099 bgcolor=#d6d6d6
| 129099 Spoelhof ||  ||  || December 3, 2004 || Calvin-Rehoboth || L. A. Molnar || — || align=right | 5.6 km || 
|-id=100 bgcolor=#E9E9E9
| 129100 Aaronammons ||  ||  || December 2, 2004 || Catalina || CSS || — || align=right | 4.3 km || 
|}

129101–129200 

|-bgcolor=#d6d6d6
| 129101 Geoffcollyer ||  ||  || December 9, 2004 || Jarnac || Jarnac Obs. || — || align=right | 5.1 km || 
|-id=102 bgcolor=#d6d6d6
| 129102 Charliecamarotte ||  ||  || December 2, 2004 || Catalina || CSS || KOR || align=right | 2.4 km || 
|-id=103 bgcolor=#fefefe
| 129103 ||  || — || December 8, 2004 || Socorro || LINEAR || MAS || align=right | 1.1 km || 
|-id=104 bgcolor=#d6d6d6
| 129104 ||  || — || December 7, 2004 || Socorro || LINEAR || TIR || align=right | 5.6 km || 
|-id=105 bgcolor=#d6d6d6
| 129105 ||  || — || December 8, 2004 || Socorro || LINEAR || — || align=right | 5.2 km || 
|-id=106 bgcolor=#d6d6d6
| 129106 ||  || — || December 8, 2004 || Socorro || LINEAR || — || align=right | 4.9 km || 
|-id=107 bgcolor=#d6d6d6
| 129107 ||  || — || December 8, 2004 || Socorro || LINEAR || — || align=right | 4.7 km || 
|-id=108 bgcolor=#E9E9E9
| 129108 Kristianwaldorff ||  ||  || December 9, 2004 || Catalina || CSS || — || align=right | 2.9 km || 
|-id=109 bgcolor=#E9E9E9
| 129109 ||  || — || December 10, 2004 || Socorro || LINEAR || — || align=right | 3.9 km || 
|-id=110 bgcolor=#fefefe
| 129110 ||  || — || December 10, 2004 || Campo Imperatore || CINEOS || — || align=right | 1.4 km || 
|-id=111 bgcolor=#d6d6d6
| 129111 ||  || — || December 10, 2004 || Socorro || LINEAR || — || align=right | 5.1 km || 
|-id=112 bgcolor=#E9E9E9
| 129112 ||  || — || December 12, 2004 || Socorro || LINEAR || — || align=right | 2.7 km || 
|-id=113 bgcolor=#d6d6d6
| 129113 ||  || — || December 2, 2004 || Kitt Peak || Spacewatch || — || align=right | 4.4 km || 
|-id=114 bgcolor=#d6d6d6
| 129114 Oliverwalthall ||  ||  || December 9, 2004 || Catalina || CSS || — || align=right | 7.1 km || 
|-id=115 bgcolor=#d6d6d6
| 129115 ||  || — || December 10, 2004 || Socorro || LINEAR || — || align=right | 4.4 km || 
|-id=116 bgcolor=#d6d6d6
| 129116 ||  || — || December 12, 2004 || Socorro || LINEAR || URS || align=right | 5.7 km || 
|-id=117 bgcolor=#d6d6d6
| 129117 ||  || — || December 11, 2004 || Socorro || LINEAR || VER || align=right | 5.5 km || 
|-id=118 bgcolor=#E9E9E9
| 129118 ||  || — || December 13, 2004 || Kitt Peak || Spacewatch || — || align=right | 1.9 km || 
|-id=119 bgcolor=#E9E9E9
| 129119 Ericmuhle ||  ||  || December 14, 2004 || Catalina || CSS || WIT || align=right | 1.9 km || 
|-id=120 bgcolor=#d6d6d6
| 129120 ||  || — || December 14, 2004 || Socorro || LINEAR || KOR || align=right | 2.9 km || 
|-id=121 bgcolor=#E9E9E9
| 129121 ||  || — || December 10, 2004 || Socorro || LINEAR || — || align=right | 2.7 km || 
|-id=122 bgcolor=#d6d6d6
| 129122 ||  || — || December 11, 2004 || Haleakala || NEAT || — || align=right | 3.7 km || 
|-id=123 bgcolor=#E9E9E9
| 129123 ||  || — || December 9, 2004 || Kitt Peak || Spacewatch || — || align=right | 3.3 km || 
|-id=124 bgcolor=#d6d6d6
| 129124 ||  || — || December 12, 2004 || Socorro || LINEAR || — || align=right | 4.9 km || 
|-id=125 bgcolor=#d6d6d6
| 129125 Chrisvoth ||  ||  || December 15, 2004 || Catalina || CSS || EOS || align=right | 4.4 km || 
|-id=126 bgcolor=#d6d6d6
| 129126 ||  || — || December 2, 2004 || Palomar || NEAT || NAE || align=right | 4.7 km || 
|-id=127 bgcolor=#E9E9E9
| 129127 ||  || — || December 2, 2004 || Palomar || NEAT || fast? || align=right | 3.1 km || 
|-id=128 bgcolor=#d6d6d6
| 129128 ||  || — || December 14, 2004 || Anderson Mesa || LONEOS || — || align=right | 6.1 km || 
|-id=129 bgcolor=#d6d6d6
| 129129 || 2004 YJ || — || December 17, 2004 || Socorro || LINEAR || EUP || align=right | 5.5 km || 
|-id=130 bgcolor=#C2FFFF
| 129130 ||  || — || December 18, 2004 || Mount Lemmon || Mount Lemmon Survey || L5 || align=right | 14 km || 
|-id=131 bgcolor=#d6d6d6
| 129131 ||  || — || December 17, 2004 || Socorro || LINEAR || HYG || align=right | 5.3 km || 
|-id=132 bgcolor=#E9E9E9
| 129132 ||  || — || December 16, 2004 || Kitt Peak || Spacewatch || — || align=right | 3.0 km || 
|-id=133 bgcolor=#C2FFFF
| 129133 ||  || — || December 20, 2004 || Mount Lemmon || Mount Lemmon Survey || L5 || align=right | 22 km || 
|-id=134 bgcolor=#C2FFFF
| 129134 ||  || — || January 6, 2005 || Catalina || CSS || L5 || align=right | 19 km || 
|-id=135 bgcolor=#C2FFFF
| 129135 ||  || — || January 6, 2005 || Catalina || CSS || L5 || align=right | 20 km || 
|-id=136 bgcolor=#d6d6d6
| 129136 ||  || — || January 7, 2005 || Socorro || LINEAR || EOS || align=right | 5.0 km || 
|-id=137 bgcolor=#C2FFFF
| 129137 Hippolochos ||  ||  || January 13, 2005 || Vicques || M. Ory || L5 || align=right | 14 km || 
|-id=138 bgcolor=#E9E9E9
| 129138 Williamfrost ||  ||  || January 13, 2005 || Catalina || CSS || — || align=right | 1.4 km || 
|-id=139 bgcolor=#d6d6d6
| 129139 ||  || — || January 13, 2005 || Kitt Peak || Spacewatch || THM || align=right | 4.9 km || 
|-id=140 bgcolor=#C2FFFF
| 129140 ||  || — || January 13, 2005 || Socorro || LINEAR || L5 || align=right | 16 km || 
|-id=141 bgcolor=#d6d6d6
| 129141 ||  || — || January 15, 2005 || Kitt Peak || Spacewatch || EOS || align=right | 2.7 km || 
|-id=142 bgcolor=#C2FFFF
| 129142 ||  || — || January 15, 2005 || Kitt Peak || Spacewatch || L5 || align=right | 13 km || 
|-id=143 bgcolor=#E9E9E9
| 129143 ||  || — || January 16, 2005 || Socorro || LINEAR || — || align=right | 1.6 km || 
|-id=144 bgcolor=#C2FFFF
| 129144 ||  || — || January 18, 2005 || Catalina || CSS || L5 || align=right | 19 km || 
|-id=145 bgcolor=#C2FFFF
| 129145 || 2005 CE || — || February 1, 2005 || Goodricke-Pigott || R. A. Tucker || L5 || align=right | 16 km || 
|-id=146 bgcolor=#d6d6d6
| 129146 Stevenglenn ||  ||  || February 4, 2005 || Catalina || CSS || LUT || align=right | 10 km || 
|-id=147 bgcolor=#C2FFFF
| 129147 ||  || — || February 1, 2005 || Catalina || CSS || L5 || align=right | 19 km || 
|-id=148 bgcolor=#E9E9E9
| 129148 Sheilahaggard ||  ||  || March 3, 2005 || Catalina || CSS || — || align=right | 3.1 km || 
|-id=149 bgcolor=#E9E9E9
| 129149 Richwitherspoon ||  ||  || March 3, 2005 || Catalina || CSS || — || align=right | 2.5 km || 
|-id=150 bgcolor=#E9E9E9
| 129150 ||  || — || March 8, 2005 || Socorro || LINEAR || — || align=right | 2.5 km || 
|-id=151 bgcolor=#E9E9E9
| 129151 Angelaboggs ||  ||  || March 3, 2005 || Catalina || CSS || — || align=right | 2.1 km || 
|-id=152 bgcolor=#E9E9E9
| 129152 Jaystpierre ||  ||  || March 9, 2005 || Catalina || CSS || — || align=right | 3.8 km || 
|-id=153 bgcolor=#C2FFFF
| 129153 ||  || — || March 10, 2005 || Catalina || CSS || L5 || align=right | 17 km || 
|-id=154 bgcolor=#fefefe
| 129154 Georgesondecker ||  ||  || March 10, 2005 || Mount Lemmon || Mount Lemmon Survey || NYS || align=right | 1.2 km || 
|-id=155 bgcolor=#E9E9E9
| 129155 ||  || — || March 12, 2005 || Socorro || LINEAR || — || align=right | 1.2 km || 
|-id=156 bgcolor=#E9E9E9
| 129156 ||  || — || March 13, 2005 || Kitt Peak || Spacewatch || MRX || align=right | 3.2 km || 
|-id=157 bgcolor=#fefefe
| 129157 ||  || — || March 10, 2005 || Calvin-Rehoboth || Calvin–Rehoboth Obs. || MAS || align=right | 1.2 km || 
|-id=158 bgcolor=#d6d6d6
| 129158 Michaelmellman ||  ||  || March 30, 2005 || Catalina || CSS || — || align=right | 3.5 km || 
|-id=159 bgcolor=#E9E9E9
| 129159 ||  || — || April 2, 2005 || Palomar || NEAT || — || align=right | 3.9 km || 
|-id=160 bgcolor=#E9E9E9
| 129160 Ericpeters ||  ||  || April 5, 2005 || Mount Lemmon || Mount Lemmon Survey || WIT || align=right | 1.5 km || 
|-id=161 bgcolor=#E9E9E9
| 129161 Mykallefevre ||  ||  || April 2, 2005 || Catalina || CSS || — || align=right | 2.8 km || 
|-id=162 bgcolor=#d6d6d6
| 129162 ||  || — || April 2, 2005 || Anderson Mesa || LONEOS || — || align=right | 8.7 km || 
|-id=163 bgcolor=#d6d6d6
| 129163 ||  || — || April 4, 2005 || Kitt Peak || Spacewatch || — || align=right | 3.5 km || 
|-id=164 bgcolor=#E9E9E9
| 129164 ||  || — || April 7, 2005 || Palomar || NEAT || HNS || align=right | 2.1 km || 
|-id=165 bgcolor=#d6d6d6
| 129165 Kevinstout ||  ||  || April 9, 2005 || Mount Lemmon || Mount Lemmon Survey || — || align=right | 4.3 km || 
|-id=166 bgcolor=#E9E9E9
| 129166 ||  || — || April 14, 2005 || Socorro || LINEAR || — || align=right | 3.4 km || 
|-id=167 bgcolor=#E9E9E9
| 129167 Dianelambert ||  ||  || May 4, 2005 || Mount Lemmon || Mount Lemmon Survey || — || align=right | 3.5 km || 
|-id=168 bgcolor=#E9E9E9
| 129168 ||  || — || May 3, 2005 || Socorro || LINEAR || WIT || align=right | 1.9 km || 
|-id=169 bgcolor=#d6d6d6
| 129169 ||  || — || May 10, 2005 || Goodricke-Pigott || R. A. Tucker || EOS || align=right | 3.4 km || 
|-id=170 bgcolor=#d6d6d6
| 129170 ||  || — || May 11, 2005 || Anderson Mesa || LONEOS || — || align=right | 3.5 km || 
|-id=171 bgcolor=#d6d6d6
| 129171 ||  || — || May 13, 2005 || Siding Spring || SSS || MEL || align=right | 5.9 km || 
|-id=172 bgcolor=#E9E9E9
| 129172 Jodizareski ||  ||  || May 13, 2005 || Catalina || CSS || MAR || align=right | 2.0 km || 
|-id=173 bgcolor=#d6d6d6
| 129173 Mattgoman ||  ||  || May 13, 2005 || Catalina || CSS || TIR || align=right | 2.5 km || 
|-id=174 bgcolor=#d6d6d6
| 129174 ||  || — || May 14, 2005 || Palomar || NEAT || — || align=right | 6.2 km || 
|-id=175 bgcolor=#fefefe
| 129175 ||  || — || May 30, 2005 || Siding Spring || SSS || NYS || align=right | 1.2 km || 
|-id=176 bgcolor=#d6d6d6
| 129176 Gerardcarter ||  ||  || June 2, 2005 || Catalina || CSS || — || align=right | 6.6 km || 
|-id=177 bgcolor=#d6d6d6
| 129177 Jeanneeha ||  ||  || June 2, 2005 || Catalina || CSS || — || align=right | 3.6 km || 
|-id=178 bgcolor=#fefefe
| 129178 ||  || — || June 4, 2005 || Kitt Peak || Spacewatch || V || align=right | 1.2 km || 
|-id=179 bgcolor=#E9E9E9
| 129179 ||  || — || June 4, 2005 || Socorro || LINEAR || HNS || align=right | 3.0 km || 
|-id=180 bgcolor=#d6d6d6
| 129180 ||  || — || June 6, 2005 || Kitt Peak || Spacewatch || EOS || align=right | 2.9 km || 
|-id=181 bgcolor=#fefefe
| 129181 ||  || — || June 10, 2005 || Kitt Peak || Spacewatch || — || align=right | 1.4 km || 
|-id=182 bgcolor=#fefefe
| 129182 ||  || — || June 11, 2005 || Kitt Peak || Spacewatch || — || align=right | 1.3 km || 
|-id=183 bgcolor=#E9E9E9
| 129183 ||  || — || June 11, 2005 || Kitt Peak || Spacewatch || MAR || align=right | 1.7 km || 
|-id=184 bgcolor=#fefefe
| 129184 ||  || — || June 12, 2005 || Kitt Peak || Spacewatch || — || align=right | 1.3 km || 
|-id=185 bgcolor=#fefefe
| 129185 Jonburroughs ||  ||  || June 14, 2005 || Mount Lemmon || Mount Lemmon Survey || EUT || align=right | 1.2 km || 
|-id=186 bgcolor=#fefefe
| 129186 Joshgrindlay ||  ||  || June 13, 2005 || Mount Lemmon || Mount Lemmon Survey || V || align=right | 1.3 km || 
|-id=187 bgcolor=#E9E9E9
| 129187 Danielalfred ||  ||  || June 11, 2005 || Catalina || CSS || BRU || align=right | 4.2 km || 
|-id=188 bgcolor=#E9E9E9
| 129188 Dangallagher ||  ||  || June 17, 2005 || Mount Lemmon || Mount Lemmon Survey || ADE || align=right | 4.0 km || 
|-id=189 bgcolor=#E9E9E9
| 129189 ||  || — || June 27, 2005 || Kitt Peak || Spacewatch || — || align=right | 1.8 km || 
|-id=190 bgcolor=#fefefe
| 129190 ||  || — || June 29, 2005 || Anderson Mesa || LONEOS || — || align=right | 1.3 km || 
|-id=191 bgcolor=#fefefe
| 129191 ||  || — || June 29, 2005 || Palomar || NEAT || FLO || align=right data-sort-value="0.98" | 980 m || 
|-id=192 bgcolor=#d6d6d6
| 129192 ||  || — || June 28, 2005 || Palomar || NEAT || — || align=right | 4.8 km || 
|-id=193 bgcolor=#fefefe
| 129193 ||  || — || June 29, 2005 || Palomar || NEAT || — || align=right | 1.4 km || 
|-id=194 bgcolor=#E9E9E9
| 129194 ||  || — || June 30, 2005 || Kitt Peak || Spacewatch || — || align=right | 5.5 km || 
|-id=195 bgcolor=#E9E9E9
| 129195 ||  || — || June 28, 2005 || Kitt Peak || Spacewatch || — || align=right | 2.4 km || 
|-id=196 bgcolor=#fefefe
| 129196 Mitchbeiser ||  ||  || June 30, 2005 || Catalina || CSS || — || align=right | 1.6 km || 
|-id=197 bgcolor=#E9E9E9
| 129197 || 2005 NC || — || July 2, 2005 || New Mexico Skies || A. Lowe || INO || align=right | 2.0 km || 
|-id=198 bgcolor=#E9E9E9
| 129198 ||  || — || July 3, 2005 || Socorro || LINEAR || — || align=right | 2.5 km || 
|-id=199 bgcolor=#E9E9E9
| 129199 ||  || — || July 2, 2005 || Catalina || CSS || — || align=right | 2.8 km || 
|-id=200 bgcolor=#d6d6d6
| 129200 ||  || — || July 1, 2005 || Kitt Peak || Spacewatch || — || align=right | 4.2 km || 
|}

129201–129300 

|-bgcolor=#E9E9E9
| 129201 Brandenallen ||  ||  || July 3, 2005 || Mount Lemmon || Mount Lemmon Survey || MAR || align=right | 5.6 km || 
|-id=202 bgcolor=#fefefe
| 129202 ||  || — || July 1, 2005 || Kitt Peak || Spacewatch || — || align=right | 1.1 km || 
|-id=203 bgcolor=#E9E9E9
| 129203 ||  || — || July 5, 2005 || Palomar || NEAT || — || align=right | 4.7 km || 
|-id=204 bgcolor=#d6d6d6
| 129204 ||  || — || July 5, 2005 || Kitt Peak || Spacewatch || — || align=right | 5.9 km || 
|-id=205 bgcolor=#d6d6d6
| 129205 ||  || — || July 5, 2005 || Kitt Peak || Spacewatch || — || align=right | 4.2 km || 
|-id=206 bgcolor=#E9E9E9
| 129206 ||  || — || July 5, 2005 || Socorro || LINEAR || — || align=right | 4.1 km || 
|-id=207 bgcolor=#C2FFFF
| 129207 ||  || — || July 4, 2005 || Mount Lemmon || Mount Lemmon Survey || L4 || align=right | 17 km || 
|-id=208 bgcolor=#d6d6d6
| 129208 ||  || — || July 5, 2005 || Kitt Peak || Spacewatch || — || align=right | 3.7 km || 
|-id=209 bgcolor=#d6d6d6
| 129209 Robertburt ||  ||  || July 10, 2005 || Catalina || CSS || EOS || align=right | 3.5 km || 
|-id=210 bgcolor=#d6d6d6
| 129210 ||  || — || July 1, 2005 || Kitt Peak || Spacewatch || — || align=right | 5.4 km || 
|-id=211 bgcolor=#E9E9E9
| 129211 ||  || — || July 1, 2005 || Kitt Peak || Spacewatch || — || align=right | 2.7 km || 
|-id=212 bgcolor=#fefefe
| 129212 ||  || — || July 3, 2005 || Palomar || NEAT || — || align=right | 1.8 km || 
|-id=213 bgcolor=#d6d6d6
| 129213 ||  || — || July 4, 2005 || Kitt Peak || Spacewatch || KAR || align=right | 1.8 km || 
|-id=214 bgcolor=#d6d6d6
| 129214 Gordoncasto ||  ||  || July 4, 2005 || Mount Lemmon || Mount Lemmon Survey || — || align=right | 3.8 km || 
|-id=215 bgcolor=#d6d6d6
| 129215 ||  || — || July 9, 2005 || Reedy Creek || J. Broughton || ALA || align=right | 6.6 km || 
|-id=216 bgcolor=#d6d6d6
| 129216 Chloecastle ||  ||  || July 10, 2005 || Catalina || CSS || TIR || align=right | 3.1 km || 
|-id=217 bgcolor=#d6d6d6
| 129217 ||  || — || July 3, 2005 || Kitt Peak || Spacewatch || — || align=right | 3.8 km || 
|-id=218 bgcolor=#fefefe
| 129218 ||  || — || July 7, 2005 || Anderson Mesa || LONEOS || — || align=right | 1.6 km || 
|-id=219 bgcolor=#d6d6d6
| 129219 ||  || — || July 10, 2005 || Kitt Peak || Spacewatch || — || align=right | 3.6 km || 
|-id=220 bgcolor=#d6d6d6
| 129220 ||  || — || July 10, 2005 || Anderson Mesa || LONEOS || EUP || align=right | 8.3 km || 
|-id=221 bgcolor=#fefefe
| 129221 ||  || — || July 26, 2005 || Haleakala || NEAT || — || align=right | 1.8 km || 
|-id=222 bgcolor=#fefefe
| 129222 ||  || — || July 29, 2005 || Palomar || NEAT || NYS || align=right | 1.1 km || 
|-id=223 bgcolor=#fefefe
| 129223 ||  || — || July 31, 2005 || Siding Spring || SSS || — || align=right | 1.4 km || 
|-id=224 bgcolor=#fefefe
| 129224 ||  || — || July 31, 2005 || Siding Spring || SSS || NYS || align=right | 3.7 km || 
|-id=225 bgcolor=#fefefe
| 129225 ||  || — || July 31, 2005 || Siding Spring || SSS || NYS || align=right | 1.2 km || 
|-id=226 bgcolor=#E9E9E9
| 129226 ||  || — || July 28, 2005 || Palomar || NEAT || — || align=right | 2.5 km || 
|-id=227 bgcolor=#fefefe
| 129227 ||  || — || July 28, 2005 || Palomar || NEAT || — || align=right | 1.3 km || 
|-id=228 bgcolor=#d6d6d6
| 129228 ||  || — || July 30, 2005 || Palomar || NEAT || — || align=right | 4.5 km || 
|-id=229 bgcolor=#fefefe
| 129229 ||  || — || August 1, 2005 || Siding Spring || SSS || — || align=right | 1.7 km || 
|-id=230 bgcolor=#fefefe
| 129230 ||  || — || August 1, 2005 || Siding Spring || SSS || NYS || align=right | 1.4 km || 
|-id=231 bgcolor=#fefefe
| 129231 ||  || — || August 2, 2005 || Socorro || LINEAR || NYS || align=right | 2.6 km || 
|-id=232 bgcolor=#d6d6d6
| 129232 ||  || — || August 2, 2005 || Socorro || LINEAR || — || align=right | 5.8 km || 
|-id=233 bgcolor=#d6d6d6
| 129233 ||  || — || August 2, 2005 || Socorro || LINEAR || — || align=right | 6.8 km || 
|-id=234 bgcolor=#fefefe
| 129234 Silly ||  ||  || August 8, 2005 || Saint-Sulpice || B. Christophe || — || align=right | 1.2 km || 
|-id=235 bgcolor=#fefefe
| 129235 ||  || — || August 15, 2005 || Pla D'Arguines || Pla D'Arguines Obs. || FLO || align=right | 1.1 km || 
|-id=236 bgcolor=#fefefe
| 129236 ||  || — || August 2, 2005 || Socorro || LINEAR || — || align=right | 1.3 km || 
|-id=237 bgcolor=#E9E9E9
| 129237 ||  || — || August 4, 2005 || Palomar || NEAT || AGN || align=right | 2.3 km || 
|-id=238 bgcolor=#fefefe
| 129238 || 2005 QV || — || August 22, 2005 || Palomar || NEAT || — || align=right | 1.4 km || 
|-id=239 bgcolor=#E9E9E9
| 129239 ||  || — || August 24, 2005 || Palomar || NEAT || — || align=right | 4.0 km || 
|-id=240 bgcolor=#fefefe
| 129240 ||  || — || August 22, 2005 || Palomar || NEAT || NYS || align=right | 1.2 km || 
|-id=241 bgcolor=#d6d6d6
| 129241 ||  || — || August 24, 2005 || Palomar || NEAT || SHU3:2 || align=right | 12 km || 
|-id=242 bgcolor=#d6d6d6
| 129242 ||  || — || August 24, 2005 || Palomar || NEAT || — || align=right | 4.5 km || 
|-id=243 bgcolor=#fefefe
| 129243 ||  || — || August 25, 2005 || Palomar || NEAT || — || align=right | 1.1 km || 
|-id=244 bgcolor=#fefefe
| 129244 ||  || — || August 26, 2005 || Anderson Mesa || LONEOS || MAS || align=right | 1.5 km || 
|-id=245 bgcolor=#fefefe
| 129245 ||  || — || August 27, 2005 || Kitt Peak || Spacewatch || — || align=right | 1.4 km || 
|-id=246 bgcolor=#d6d6d6
| 129246 ||  || — || August 27, 2005 || Kitt Peak || Spacewatch || — || align=right | 4.0 km || 
|-id=247 bgcolor=#fefefe
| 129247 ||  || — || August 27, 2005 || Kitt Peak || Spacewatch || — || align=right | 3.1 km || 
|-id=248 bgcolor=#FA8072
| 129248 ||  || — || August 25, 2005 || Palomar || NEAT || — || align=right data-sort-value="0.94" | 940 m || 
|-id=249 bgcolor=#fefefe
| 129249 ||  || — || August 26, 2005 || Anderson Mesa || LONEOS || — || align=right | 1.5 km || 
|-id=250 bgcolor=#d6d6d6
| 129250 ||  || — || August 26, 2005 || Anderson Mesa || LONEOS || — || align=right | 5.1 km || 
|-id=251 bgcolor=#fefefe
| 129251 ||  || — || August 26, 2005 || Anderson Mesa || LONEOS || — || align=right | 1.8 km || 
|-id=252 bgcolor=#d6d6d6
| 129252 ||  || — || August 26, 2005 || Palomar || NEAT || — || align=right | 5.3 km || 
|-id=253 bgcolor=#E9E9E9
| 129253 ||  || — || August 27, 2005 || Anderson Mesa || LONEOS || — || align=right | 3.9 km || 
|-id=254 bgcolor=#d6d6d6
| 129254 ||  || — || August 27, 2005 || Anderson Mesa || LONEOS || — || align=right | 8.8 km || 
|-id=255 bgcolor=#d6d6d6
| 129255 ||  || — || August 28, 2005 || Siding Spring || SSS || EOS || align=right | 3.8 km || 
|-id=256 bgcolor=#d6d6d6
| 129256 ||  || — || August 29, 2005 || Socorro || LINEAR || EOS || align=right | 3.1 km || 
|-id=257 bgcolor=#d6d6d6
| 129257 ||  || — || August 29, 2005 || Kitt Peak || Spacewatch || HYG || align=right | 5.6 km || 
|-id=258 bgcolor=#E9E9E9
| 129258 ||  || — || August 24, 2005 || Palomar || NEAT || — || align=right | 3.9 km || 
|-id=259 bgcolor=#d6d6d6
| 129259 Tapolca ||  ||  || August 25, 2005 || Piszkéstető || K. Sárneczky, D. Szám || SYL7:4 || align=right | 6.4 km || 
|-id=260 bgcolor=#E9E9E9
| 129260 ||  || — || August 29, 2005 || Anderson Mesa || LONEOS || HEN || align=right | 1.9 km || 
|-id=261 bgcolor=#fefefe
| 129261 ||  || — || August 31, 2005 || Socorro || LINEAR || H || align=right | 1.1 km || 
|-id=262 bgcolor=#d6d6d6
| 129262 ||  || — || August 31, 2005 || Socorro || LINEAR || EUP || align=right | 5.7 km || 
|-id=263 bgcolor=#fefefe
| 129263 ||  || — || August 27, 2005 || Palomar || NEAT || — || align=right | 2.4 km || 
|-id=264 bgcolor=#d6d6d6
| 129264 ||  || — || August 27, 2005 || Palomar || NEAT || — || align=right | 5.1 km || 
|-id=265 bgcolor=#fefefe
| 129265 ||  || — || August 27, 2005 || Palomar || NEAT || — || align=right | 1.4 km || 
|-id=266 bgcolor=#fefefe
| 129266 ||  || — || August 27, 2005 || Palomar || NEAT || PHO || align=right | 3.7 km || 
|-id=267 bgcolor=#d6d6d6
| 129267 ||  || — || August 28, 2005 || Kitt Peak || Spacewatch || — || align=right | 3.5 km || 
|-id=268 bgcolor=#d6d6d6
| 129268 ||  || — || August 28, 2005 || Kitt Peak || Spacewatch || KAR || align=right | 1.7 km || 
|-id=269 bgcolor=#E9E9E9
| 129269 ||  || — || August 27, 2005 || Anderson Mesa || LONEOS || GEF || align=right | 2.4 km || 
|-id=270 bgcolor=#fefefe
| 129270 ||  || — || August 28, 2005 || Anderson Mesa || LONEOS || V || align=right | 1.3 km || 
|-id=271 bgcolor=#fefefe
| 129271 ||  || — || August 28, 2005 || Siding Spring || SSS || V || align=right | 1.1 km || 
|-id=272 bgcolor=#fefefe
| 129272 ||  || — || August 29, 2005 || Palomar || NEAT || V || align=right | 1.3 km || 
|-id=273 bgcolor=#d6d6d6
| 129273 ||  || — || August 29, 2005 || Palomar || NEAT || — || align=right | 5.9 km || 
|-id=274 bgcolor=#fefefe
| 129274 ||  || — || August 31, 2005 || Palomar || NEAT || NYS || align=right | 3.4 km || 
|-id=275 bgcolor=#d6d6d6
| 129275 ||  || — || September 4, 2005 || Bergisch Gladbach || W. Bickel || — || align=right | 4.2 km || 
|-id=276 bgcolor=#d6d6d6
| 129276 ||  || — || September 8, 2005 || Socorro || LINEAR || — || align=right | 5.9 km || 
|-id=277 bgcolor=#E9E9E9
| 129277 Jianxinchen ||  ||  || September 6, 2005 || Catalina || CSS || — || align=right | 3.0 km || 
|-id=278 bgcolor=#d6d6d6
| 129278 ||  || — || September 8, 2005 || Socorro || LINEAR || KOR || align=right | 2.5 km || 
|-id=279 bgcolor=#E9E9E9
| 129279 ||  || — || September 10, 2005 || Anderson Mesa || LONEOS || — || align=right | 4.7 km || 
|-id=280 bgcolor=#E9E9E9
| 129280 ||  || — || September 1, 2005 || Palomar || NEAT || — || align=right | 2.0 km || 
|-id=281 bgcolor=#d6d6d6
| 129281 ||  || — || September 6, 2005 || Anderson Mesa || LONEOS || — || align=right | 5.0 km || 
|-id=282 bgcolor=#d6d6d6
| 129282 ||  || — || September 13, 2005 || Anderson Mesa || LONEOS || ALA || align=right | 8.6 km || 
|-id=283 bgcolor=#fefefe
| 129283 ||  || — || September 13, 2005 || Kitt Peak || Spacewatch || V || align=right | 1.1 km || 
|-id=284 bgcolor=#E9E9E9
| 129284 ||  || — || September 13, 2005 || Anderson Mesa || LONEOS || MAR || align=right | 2.7 km || 
|-id=285 bgcolor=#d6d6d6
| 129285 ||  || — || September 24, 2005 || Kitt Peak || Spacewatch || HYG || align=right | 5.2 km || 
|-id=286 bgcolor=#fefefe
| 129286 ||  || — || September 23, 2005 || Kitt Peak || Spacewatch || NYS || align=right data-sort-value="0.98" | 980 m || 
|-id=287 bgcolor=#d6d6d6
| 129287 ||  || — || September 25, 2005 || Kitt Peak || Spacewatch || KOR || align=right | 2.2 km || 
|-id=288 bgcolor=#d6d6d6
| 129288 ||  || — || September 26, 2005 || Kitt Peak || Spacewatch || — || align=right | 4.3 km || 
|-id=289 bgcolor=#fefefe
| 129289 ||  || — || September 24, 2005 || Kitt Peak || Spacewatch || — || align=right | 1.5 km || 
|-id=290 bgcolor=#fefefe
| 129290 ||  || — || September 24, 2005 || Kitt Peak || Spacewatch || NYS || align=right data-sort-value="0.98" | 980 m || 
|-id=291 bgcolor=#d6d6d6
| 129291 ||  || — || September 26, 2005 || Goodricke-Pigott || R. A. Tucker || HYG || align=right | 5.7 km || 
|-id=292 bgcolor=#E9E9E9
| 129292 ||  || — || September 27, 2005 || Palomar || NEAT || — || align=right | 3.7 km || 
|-id=293 bgcolor=#E9E9E9
| 129293 ||  || — || September 24, 2005 || Kitt Peak || Spacewatch || PAD || align=right | 2.2 km || 
|-id=294 bgcolor=#E9E9E9
| 129294 ||  || — || September 25, 2005 || Palomar || NEAT || — || align=right | 3.9 km || 
|-id=295 bgcolor=#fefefe
| 129295 ||  || — || September 26, 2005 || Kitt Peak || Spacewatch || — || align=right | 1.4 km || 
|-id=296 bgcolor=#E9E9E9
| 129296 ||  || — || September 28, 2005 || Palomar || NEAT || HNS || align=right | 2.0 km || 
|-id=297 bgcolor=#fefefe
| 129297 ||  || — || September 29, 2005 || Palomar || NEAT || V || align=right | 1.3 km || 
|-id=298 bgcolor=#d6d6d6
| 129298 ||  || — || September 29, 2005 || Kitt Peak || Spacewatch || THM || align=right | 4.3 km || 
|-id=299 bgcolor=#d6d6d6
| 129299 ||  || — || September 25, 2005 || Kitt Peak || Spacewatch || — || align=right | 3.0 km || 
|-id=300 bgcolor=#E9E9E9
| 129300 ||  || — || September 25, 2005 || Palomar || NEAT || — || align=right | 4.1 km || 
|}

129301–129400 

|-bgcolor=#E9E9E9
| 129301 ||  || — || September 25, 2005 || Palomar || NEAT || — || align=right | 1.9 km || 
|-id=302 bgcolor=#fefefe
| 129302 ||  || — || September 27, 2005 || Kitt Peak || Spacewatch || FLO || align=right | 1.6 km || 
|-id=303 bgcolor=#d6d6d6
| 129303 ||  || — || September 27, 2005 || Palomar || NEAT || — || align=right | 5.5 km || 
|-id=304 bgcolor=#d6d6d6
| 129304 ||  || — || September 27, 2005 || Palomar || NEAT || — || align=right | 8.3 km || 
|-id=305 bgcolor=#fefefe
| 129305 ||  || — || September 28, 2005 || Palomar || NEAT || V || align=right | 1.1 km || 
|-id=306 bgcolor=#fefefe
| 129306 ||  || — || September 29, 2005 || Palomar || NEAT || NYS || align=right | 1.5 km || 
|-id=307 bgcolor=#E9E9E9
| 129307 Tomconnors ||  ||  || September 29, 2005 || Catalina || CSS || — || align=right | 3.9 km || 
|-id=308 bgcolor=#d6d6d6
| 129308 ||  || — || September 29, 2005 || Kitt Peak || Spacewatch || — || align=right | 6.6 km || 
|-id=309 bgcolor=#fefefe
| 129309 ||  || — || September 29, 2005 || Kitt Peak || Spacewatch || NYS || align=right | 1.2 km || 
|-id=310 bgcolor=#E9E9E9
| 129310 ||  || — || September 30, 2005 || Palomar || NEAT || — || align=right | 2.9 km || 
|-id=311 bgcolor=#fefefe
| 129311 ||  || — || September 30, 2005 || Palomar || NEAT || — || align=right | 1.6 km || 
|-id=312 bgcolor=#d6d6d6
| 129312 Drouetdaubigny ||  ||  || September 30, 2005 || Catalina || CSS || — || align=right | 7.3 km || 
|-id=313 bgcolor=#fefefe
| 129313 ||  || — || September 30, 2005 || Palomar || NEAT || V || align=right | 1.1 km || 
|-id=314 bgcolor=#d6d6d6
| 129314 Dathongolish ||  ||  || September 29, 2005 || Catalina || CSS || EUP || align=right | 6.9 km || 
|-id=315 bgcolor=#d6d6d6
| 129315 ||  || — || September 18, 2005 || Palomar || NEAT || — || align=right | 6.5 km || 
|-id=316 bgcolor=#d6d6d6
| 129316 ||  || — || October 3, 2005 || Palomar || NEAT || — || align=right | 8.7 km || 
|-id=317 bgcolor=#fefefe
| 129317 ||  || — || October 1, 2005 || Socorro || LINEAR || NYS || align=right | 1.2 km || 
|-id=318 bgcolor=#E9E9E9
| 129318 Sarahschlieder ||  ||  || October 1, 2005 || Mount Lemmon || Mount Lemmon Survey || AST || align=right | 3.0 km || 
|-id=319 bgcolor=#E9E9E9
| 129319 ||  || — || October 1, 2005 || Socorro || LINEAR || MAR || align=right | 2.2 km || 
|-id=320 bgcolor=#E9E9E9
| 129320 ||  || — || October 1, 2005 || Anderson Mesa || LONEOS || — || align=right | 4.1 km || 
|-id=321 bgcolor=#fefefe
| 129321 Tannercampbell ||  ||  || October 1, 2005 || Mount Lemmon || Mount Lemmon Survey || — || align=right | 1.1 km || 
|-id=322 bgcolor=#FA8072
| 129322 ||  || — || October 6, 2005 || Anderson Mesa || LONEOS || — || align=right | 2.6 km || 
|-id=323 bgcolor=#d6d6d6
| 129323 ||  || — || October 5, 2005 || Kitt Peak || Spacewatch || — || align=right | 3.6 km || 
|-id=324 bgcolor=#fefefe
| 129324 Johnweirich ||  ||  || October 4, 2005 || Mount Lemmon || Mount Lemmon Survey || NYS || align=right | 1.1 km || 
|-id=325 bgcolor=#d6d6d6
| 129325 Jedhancock ||  ||  || October 5, 2005 || Catalina || CSS || — || align=right | 8.0 km || 
|-id=326 bgcolor=#E9E9E9
| 129326 ||  || — || October 3, 2005 || Socorro || LINEAR || — || align=right | 3.3 km || 
|-id=327 bgcolor=#E9E9E9
| 129327 Davehamara ||  ||  || October 10, 2005 || Catalina || CSS || — || align=right | 4.4 km || 
|-id=328 bgcolor=#E9E9E9
| 129328 Loriharrison ||  ||  || October 10, 2005 || Catalina || CSS || — || align=right | 2.4 km || 
|-id=329 bgcolor=#fefefe
| 129329 ||  || — || October 13, 2005 || Socorro || LINEAR || V || align=right data-sort-value="0.94" | 940 m || 
|-id=330 bgcolor=#d6d6d6
| 129330 Karlharshman ||  ||  || October 22, 2005 || Catalina || CSS || — || align=right | 4.2 km || 
|-id=331 bgcolor=#fefefe
| 129331 ||  || — || October 23, 2005 || Kitt Peak || Spacewatch || NYS || align=right | 1.5 km || 
|-id=332 bgcolor=#E9E9E9
| 129332 Markhunten ||  ||  || October 23, 2005 || Catalina || CSS || — || align=right | 3.4 km || 
|-id=333 bgcolor=#d6d6d6
| 129333 Ashleylancaster ||  ||  || October 23, 2005 || Catalina || CSS || THM || align=right | 5.9 km || 
|-id=334 bgcolor=#fefefe
| 129334 ||  || — || October 22, 2005 || Palomar || NEAT || V || align=right data-sort-value="0.87" | 870 m || 
|-id=335 bgcolor=#fefefe
| 129335 Edwardlittle ||  ||  || October 23, 2005 || Catalina || CSS || FLO || align=right | 1.1 km || 
|-id=336 bgcolor=#E9E9E9
| 129336 ||  || — || October 23, 2005 || Palomar || NEAT || — || align=right | 3.8 km || 
|-id=337 bgcolor=#fefefe
| 129337 ||  || — || October 23, 2005 || Palomar || NEAT || — || align=right | 1.3 km || 
|-id=338 bgcolor=#d6d6d6
| 129338 Andrewlowman ||  ||  || October 23, 2005 || Catalina || CSS || — || align=right | 4.1 km || 
|-id=339 bgcolor=#E9E9E9
| 129339 ||  || — || October 22, 2005 || Kitt Peak || Spacewatch || — || align=right | 2.2 km || 
|-id=340 bgcolor=#d6d6d6
| 129340 ||  || — || October 24, 2005 || Kitt Peak || Spacewatch || — || align=right | 4.3 km || 
|-id=341 bgcolor=#d6d6d6
| 129341 ||  || — || October 24, 2005 || Palomar || NEAT || — || align=right | 4.7 km || 
|-id=342 bgcolor=#E9E9E9
| 129342 Ependes ||  ||  || November 5, 2005 || Marly || P. Kocher || — || align=right | 3.0 km || 
|-id=343 bgcolor=#fefefe
| 129343 || 2063 P-L || — || September 24, 1960 || Palomar || PLS || — || align=right | 1.7 km || 
|-id=344 bgcolor=#fefefe
| 129344 || 2094 P-L || — || September 24, 1960 || Palomar || PLS || — || align=right | 1.2 km || 
|-id=345 bgcolor=#E9E9E9
| 129345 || 2116 P-L || — || September 26, 1960 || Palomar || PLS || — || align=right | 4.0 km || 
|-id=346 bgcolor=#E9E9E9
| 129346 || 2222 P-L || — || September 24, 1960 || Palomar || PLS || — || align=right | 2.8 km || 
|-id=347 bgcolor=#fefefe
| 129347 || 2234 P-L || — || October 17, 1960 || Palomar || PLS || — || align=right | 1.1 km || 
|-id=348 bgcolor=#d6d6d6
| 129348 || 2513 P-L || — || September 24, 1960 || Palomar || PLS || — || align=right | 4.7 km || 
|-id=349 bgcolor=#E9E9E9
| 129349 || 2514 P-L || — || September 24, 1960 || Palomar || PLS || — || align=right | 2.5 km || 
|-id=350 bgcolor=#fefefe
| 129350 || 2515 P-L || — || September 24, 1960 || Palomar || PLS || V || align=right | 1.2 km || 
|-id=351 bgcolor=#d6d6d6
| 129351 || 2652 P-L || — || September 24, 1960 || Palomar || PLS || THM || align=right | 3.4 km || 
|-id=352 bgcolor=#d6d6d6
| 129352 || 2664 P-L || — || September 24, 1960 || Palomar || PLS || — || align=right | 3.7 km || 
|-id=353 bgcolor=#d6d6d6
| 129353 || 2719 P-L || — || September 24, 1960 || Palomar || PLS || — || align=right | 4.0 km || 
|-id=354 bgcolor=#E9E9E9
| 129354 || 2747 P-L || — || September 24, 1960 || Palomar || PLS || — || align=right | 2.0 km || 
|-id=355 bgcolor=#E9E9E9
| 129355 || 3004 P-L || — || September 24, 1960 || Palomar || PLS || — || align=right | 3.6 km || 
|-id=356 bgcolor=#E9E9E9
| 129356 || 3067 P-L || — || September 25, 1960 || Palomar || PLS || — || align=right | 2.0 km || 
|-id=357 bgcolor=#E9E9E9
| 129357 || 3099 P-L || — || September 24, 1960 || Palomar || PLS || BRU || align=right | 4.8 km || 
|-id=358 bgcolor=#E9E9E9
| 129358 || 3105 P-L || — || September 24, 1960 || Palomar || PLS || — || align=right | 5.3 km || 
|-id=359 bgcolor=#d6d6d6
| 129359 || 4209 P-L || — || September 24, 1960 || Palomar || PLS || HYG || align=right | 5.1 km || 
|-id=360 bgcolor=#d6d6d6
| 129360 || 4263 P-L || — || September 24, 1960 || Palomar || PLS || EOS || align=right | 3.6 km || 
|-id=361 bgcolor=#E9E9E9
| 129361 || 4324 P-L || — || September 24, 1960 || Palomar || PLS || ADE || align=right | 5.2 km || 
|-id=362 bgcolor=#d6d6d6
| 129362 || 4327 P-L || — || September 24, 1960 || Palomar || PLS || — || align=right | 7.1 km || 
|-id=363 bgcolor=#fefefe
| 129363 || 4330 P-L || — || September 24, 1960 || Palomar || PLS || — || align=right | 1.2 km || 
|-id=364 bgcolor=#fefefe
| 129364 || 4719 P-L || — || September 24, 1960 || Palomar || PLS || MAS || align=right | 1.0 km || 
|-id=365 bgcolor=#fefefe
| 129365 || 4751 P-L || — || September 24, 1960 || Palomar || PLS || NYS || align=right | 1.0 km || 
|-id=366 bgcolor=#E9E9E9
| 129366 || 4752 P-L || — || September 24, 1960 || Palomar || PLS || XIZ || align=right | 2.0 km || 
|-id=367 bgcolor=#E9E9E9
| 129367 || 4795 P-L || — || September 24, 1960 || Palomar || PLS || — || align=right | 3.6 km || 
|-id=368 bgcolor=#d6d6d6
| 129368 || 4823 P-L || — || September 24, 1960 || Palomar || PLS || THM || align=right | 4.3 km || 
|-id=369 bgcolor=#fefefe
| 129369 || 4909 P-L || — || September 24, 1960 || Palomar || PLS || MAS || align=right data-sort-value="0.99" | 990 m || 
|-id=370 bgcolor=#d6d6d6
| 129370 || 6258 P-L || — || September 24, 1960 || Palomar || PLS || HYG || align=right | 5.2 km || 
|-id=371 bgcolor=#fefefe
| 129371 || 6266 P-L || — || September 24, 1960 || Palomar || PLS || NYS || align=right | 1.2 km || 
|-id=372 bgcolor=#fefefe
| 129372 || 6291 P-L || — || September 24, 1960 || Palomar || PLS || — || align=right | 1.1 km || 
|-id=373 bgcolor=#E9E9E9
| 129373 || 6318 P-L || — || September 24, 1960 || Palomar || PLS || ADE || align=right | 3.8 km || 
|-id=374 bgcolor=#E9E9E9
| 129374 || 6340 P-L || — || September 24, 1960 || Palomar || PLS || PAD || align=right | 2.7 km || 
|-id=375 bgcolor=#E9E9E9
| 129375 || 6350 P-L || — || September 24, 1960 || Palomar || PLS || — || align=right | 1.4 km || 
|-id=376 bgcolor=#E9E9E9
| 129376 || 6357 P-L || — || September 24, 1960 || Palomar || PLS || — || align=right | 4.3 km || 
|-id=377 bgcolor=#d6d6d6
| 129377 || 6716 P-L || — || September 24, 1960 || Palomar || PLS || — || align=right | 5.5 km || 
|-id=378 bgcolor=#d6d6d6
| 129378 || 6729 P-L || — || September 24, 1960 || Palomar || PLS || — || align=right | 5.8 km || 
|-id=379 bgcolor=#E9E9E9
| 129379 || 6799 P-L || — || September 24, 1960 || Palomar || PLS || — || align=right | 3.1 km || 
|-id=380 bgcolor=#E9E9E9
| 129380 || 6839 P-L || — || September 24, 1960 || Palomar || PLS || — || align=right | 1.9 km || 
|-id=381 bgcolor=#d6d6d6
| 129381 || 6850 P-L || — || September 24, 1960 || Palomar || PLS || KOR || align=right | 2.4 km || 
|-id=382 bgcolor=#d6d6d6
| 129382 || 6852 P-L || — || September 24, 1960 || Palomar || PLS || — || align=right | 3.8 km || 
|-id=383 bgcolor=#fefefe
| 129383 || 7623 P-L || — || October 22, 1960 || Palomar || PLS || NYS || align=right | 1.3 km || 
|-id=384 bgcolor=#fefefe
| 129384 || 1218 T-1 || — || March 25, 1971 || Palomar || PLS || — || align=right | 1.3 km || 
|-id=385 bgcolor=#E9E9E9
| 129385 || 4041 T-1 || — || March 26, 1971 || Palomar || PLS || — || align=right | 2.8 km || 
|-id=386 bgcolor=#d6d6d6
| 129386 || 1027 T-2 || — || September 29, 1973 || Palomar || PLS || — || align=right | 5.4 km || 
|-id=387 bgcolor=#E9E9E9
| 129387 || 1129 T-2 || — || September 29, 1973 || Palomar || PLS || — || align=right | 4.7 km || 
|-id=388 bgcolor=#fefefe
| 129388 || 1149 T-2 || — || September 29, 1973 || Palomar || PLS || FLO || align=right | 1.1 km || 
|-id=389 bgcolor=#fefefe
| 129389 || 1285 T-2 || — || September 29, 1973 || Palomar || PLS || — || align=right | 1.6 km || 
|-id=390 bgcolor=#d6d6d6
| 129390 || 1291 T-2 || — || September 29, 1973 || Palomar || PLS || — || align=right | 3.5 km || 
|-id=391 bgcolor=#fefefe
| 129391 || 1319 T-2 || — || September 29, 1973 || Palomar || PLS || FLO || align=right | 1.3 km || 
|-id=392 bgcolor=#d6d6d6
| 129392 || 1339 T-2 || — || September 29, 1973 || Palomar || PLS || — || align=right | 3.5 km || 
|-id=393 bgcolor=#fefefe
| 129393 || 1362 T-2 || — || September 29, 1973 || Palomar || PLS || V || align=right | 1.2 km || 
|-id=394 bgcolor=#E9E9E9
| 129394 || 1402 T-2 || — || September 29, 1973 || Palomar || PLS || — || align=right | 1.6 km || 
|-id=395 bgcolor=#fefefe
| 129395 || 1421 T-2 || — || September 29, 1973 || Palomar || PLS || NYS || align=right data-sort-value="0.88" | 880 m || 
|-id=396 bgcolor=#fefefe
| 129396 || 1424 T-2 || — || September 29, 1973 || Palomar || PLS || NYS || align=right | 2.4 km || 
|-id=397 bgcolor=#fefefe
| 129397 || 1508 T-2 || — || September 29, 1973 || Palomar || PLS || — || align=right | 1.6 km || 
|-id=398 bgcolor=#fefefe
| 129398 || 2109 T-2 || — || September 29, 1973 || Palomar || PLS || FLO || align=right | 1.2 km || 
|-id=399 bgcolor=#d6d6d6
| 129399 || 2186 T-2 || — || September 29, 1973 || Palomar || PLS || KOR || align=right | 3.0 km || 
|-id=400 bgcolor=#fefefe
| 129400 || 2321 T-2 || — || September 29, 1973 || Palomar || PLS || NYS || align=right data-sort-value="0.78" | 780 m || 
|}

129401–129500 

|-bgcolor=#fefefe
| 129401 || 3098 T-2 || — || September 30, 1973 || Palomar || PLS || — || align=right | 1.4 km || 
|-id=402 bgcolor=#E9E9E9
| 129402 || 4093 T-2 || — || September 29, 1973 || Palomar || PLS || — || align=right | 2.2 km || 
|-id=403 bgcolor=#E9E9E9
| 129403 || 4185 T-2 || — || September 29, 1973 || Palomar || PLS || — || align=right | 3.7 km || 
|-id=404 bgcolor=#d6d6d6
| 129404 || 5021 T-2 || — || September 25, 1973 || Palomar || PLS || — || align=right | 5.1 km || 
|-id=405 bgcolor=#E9E9E9
| 129405 || 5046 T-2 || — || September 25, 1973 || Palomar || PLS || — || align=right | 5.0 km || 
|-id=406 bgcolor=#fefefe
| 129406 || 5092 T-2 || — || September 25, 1973 || Palomar || PLS || — || align=right | 1.4 km || 
|-id=407 bgcolor=#d6d6d6
| 129407 || 5177 T-2 || — || September 25, 1973 || Palomar || PLS || EOS || align=right | 3.2 km || 
|-id=408 bgcolor=#d6d6d6
| 129408 || 1045 T-3 || — || October 17, 1977 || Palomar || PLS || — || align=right | 6.0 km || 
|-id=409 bgcolor=#fefefe
| 129409 || 2033 T-3 || — || October 16, 1977 || Palomar || PLS || — || align=right | 1.4 km || 
|-id=410 bgcolor=#d6d6d6
| 129410 || 2150 T-3 || — || October 16, 1977 || Palomar || PLS || — || align=right | 4.9 km || 
|-id=411 bgcolor=#fefefe
| 129411 || 2154 T-3 || — || October 16, 1977 || Palomar || PLS || FLO || align=right | 1.0 km || 
|-id=412 bgcolor=#d6d6d6
| 129412 || 2160 T-3 || — || October 16, 1977 || Palomar || PLS || HYG || align=right | 5.2 km || 
|-id=413 bgcolor=#fefefe
| 129413 || 2226 T-3 || — || October 16, 1977 || Palomar || PLS || — || align=right | 1.4 km || 
|-id=414 bgcolor=#fefefe
| 129414 || 2231 T-3 || — || October 16, 1977 || Palomar || PLS || NYS || align=right | 1.4 km || 
|-id=415 bgcolor=#fefefe
| 129415 || 2277 T-3 || — || October 16, 1977 || Palomar || PLS || FLO || align=right | 1.1 km || 
|-id=416 bgcolor=#fefefe
| 129416 || 2291 T-3 || — || October 16, 1977 || Palomar || PLS || V || align=right data-sort-value="0.92" | 920 m || 
|-id=417 bgcolor=#E9E9E9
| 129417 || 2613 T-3 || — || October 16, 1977 || Palomar || PLS || PAD || align=right | 4.0 km || 
|-id=418 bgcolor=#d6d6d6
| 129418 || 2617 T-3 || — || October 16, 1977 || Palomar || PLS || HYG || align=right | 4.1 km || 
|-id=419 bgcolor=#d6d6d6
| 129419 || 2619 T-3 || — || October 16, 1977 || Palomar || PLS || fast? || align=right | 6.9 km || 
|-id=420 bgcolor=#d6d6d6
| 129420 || 3114 T-3 || — || October 16, 1977 || Palomar || PLS || THM || align=right | 6.0 km || 
|-id=421 bgcolor=#d6d6d6
| 129421 || 3147 T-3 || — || October 16, 1977 || Palomar || PLS || — || align=right | 3.6 km || 
|-id=422 bgcolor=#E9E9E9
| 129422 || 3223 T-3 || — || October 16, 1977 || Palomar || PLS || NEM || align=right | 3.8 km || 
|-id=423 bgcolor=#E9E9E9
| 129423 || 3379 T-3 || — || October 16, 1977 || Palomar || PLS || — || align=right | 2.6 km || 
|-id=424 bgcolor=#d6d6d6
| 129424 || 3415 T-3 || — || October 16, 1977 || Palomar || PLS || — || align=right | 5.5 km || 
|-id=425 bgcolor=#E9E9E9
| 129425 || 3497 T-3 || — || October 16, 1977 || Palomar || PLS || — || align=right | 2.0 km || 
|-id=426 bgcolor=#E9E9E9
| 129426 || 3516 T-3 || — || October 16, 1977 || Palomar || PLS || — || align=right | 3.2 km || 
|-id=427 bgcolor=#d6d6d6
| 129427 || 4123 T-3 || — || October 16, 1977 || Palomar || PLS || — || align=right | 5.8 km || 
|-id=428 bgcolor=#fefefe
| 129428 || 4164 T-3 || — || October 16, 1977 || Palomar || PLS || FLO || align=right | 2.7 km || 
|-id=429 bgcolor=#d6d6d6
| 129429 || 4289 T-3 || — || October 16, 1977 || Palomar || PLS || — || align=right | 5.9 km || 
|-id=430 bgcolor=#d6d6d6
| 129430 || 4305 T-3 || — || October 16, 1977 || Palomar || PLS || TIR || align=right | 4.0 km || 
|-id=431 bgcolor=#E9E9E9
| 129431 || 4355 T-3 || — || October 16, 1977 || Palomar || PLS || — || align=right | 1.4 km || 
|-id=432 bgcolor=#E9E9E9
| 129432 || 4506 T-3 || — || October 16, 1977 || Palomar || PLS || GEF || align=right | 2.6 km || 
|-id=433 bgcolor=#fefefe
| 129433 || 4608 T-3 || — || October 16, 1977 || Palomar || PLS || — || align=right | 2.7 km || 
|-id=434 bgcolor=#E9E9E9
| 129434 || 5013 T-3 || — || October 16, 1977 || Palomar || PLS || — || align=right | 3.7 km || 
|-id=435 bgcolor=#E9E9E9
| 129435 || 5017 T-3 || — || October 16, 1977 || Palomar || PLS || GEF || align=right | 2.2 km || 
|-id=436 bgcolor=#d6d6d6
| 129436 || 5039 T-3 || — || October 16, 1977 || Palomar || PLS || — || align=right | 6.4 km || 
|-id=437 bgcolor=#E9E9E9
| 129437 || 1978 NG || — || July 10, 1978 || Palomar || E. F. Helin, E. M. Shoemaker || — || align=right | 3.3 km || 
|-id=438 bgcolor=#E9E9E9
| 129438 ||  || — || June 25, 1979 || Siding Spring || E. F. Helin, S. J. Bus || — || align=right | 3.8 km || 
|-id=439 bgcolor=#d6d6d6
| 129439 ||  || — || August 4, 1980 || Siding Spring || Edinburgh Obs. || — || align=right | 6.3 km || 
|-id=440 bgcolor=#E9E9E9
| 129440 ||  || — || February 28, 1981 || Siding Spring || S. J. Bus || — || align=right | 2.5 km || 
|-id=441 bgcolor=#E9E9E9
| 129441 ||  || — || February 28, 1981 || Siding Spring || S. J. Bus || DOR || align=right | 4.7 km || 
|-id=442 bgcolor=#E9E9E9
| 129442 ||  || — || March 1, 1981 || Siding Spring || S. J. Bus || — || align=right | 2.1 km || 
|-id=443 bgcolor=#E9E9E9
| 129443 ||  || — || March 2, 1981 || Siding Spring || S. J. Bus || — || align=right | 2.0 km || 
|-id=444 bgcolor=#fefefe
| 129444 ||  || — || March 3, 1981 || Siding Spring || S. J. Bus || NYS || align=right | 1.0 km || 
|-id=445 bgcolor=#d6d6d6
| 129445 ||  || — || March 7, 1981 || Siding Spring || S. J. Bus || TRP || align=right | 3.0 km || 
|-id=446 bgcolor=#E9E9E9
| 129446 ||  || — || March 2, 1981 || Siding Spring || S. J. Bus || — || align=right | 4.7 km || 
|-id=447 bgcolor=#fefefe
| 129447 ||  || — || March 1, 1981 || Siding Spring || S. J. Bus || V || align=right data-sort-value="0.94" | 940 m || 
|-id=448 bgcolor=#fefefe
| 129448 ||  || — || September 26, 1989 || La Silla || E. W. Elst || ERI || align=right | 3.0 km || 
|-id=449 bgcolor=#E9E9E9
| 129449 ||  || — || November 18, 1990 || La Silla || E. W. Elst || — || align=right | 4.0 km || 
|-id=450 bgcolor=#FA8072
| 129450 || 1991 JM || — || May 5, 1991 || Kitt Peak || Spacewatch || H || align=right | 1.4 km || 
|-id=451 bgcolor=#fefefe
| 129451 || 1991 KD || — || May 18, 1991 || Palomar || C. S. Shoemaker || PHO || align=right | 3.1 km || 
|-id=452 bgcolor=#d6d6d6
| 129452 ||  || — || October 6, 1991 || Palomar || A. Lowe || HYG || align=right | 4.6 km || 
|-id=453 bgcolor=#E9E9E9
| 129453 ||  || — || October 6, 1991 || Palomar || A. Lowe || MAR || align=right | 1.7 km || 
|-id=454 bgcolor=#E9E9E9
| 129454 ||  || — || October 31, 1991 || Kitami || A. Takahashi, K. Watanabe || MIT || align=right | 6.1 km || 
|-id=455 bgcolor=#E9E9E9
| 129455 ||  || — || January 30, 1992 || La Silla || E. W. Elst || — || align=right | 2.8 km || 
|-id=456 bgcolor=#fefefe
| 129456 ||  || — || February 29, 1992 || La Silla || UESAC || — || align=right | 1.2 km || 
|-id=457 bgcolor=#fefefe
| 129457 ||  || — || March 1, 1992 || La Silla || UESAC || — || align=right | 1.7 km || 
|-id=458 bgcolor=#fefefe
| 129458 ||  || — || March 1, 1992 || La Silla || UESAC || V || align=right | 1.3 km || 
|-id=459 bgcolor=#E9E9E9
| 129459 ||  || — || March 2, 1992 || La Silla || UESAC || DOR || align=right | 5.5 km || 
|-id=460 bgcolor=#d6d6d6
| 129460 ||  || — || August 6, 1992 || Palomar || H. E. Holt || — || align=right | 4.7 km || 
|-id=461 bgcolor=#E9E9E9
| 129461 ||  || — || March 17, 1993 || La Silla || UESAC || — || align=right | 2.7 km || 
|-id=462 bgcolor=#E9E9E9
| 129462 ||  || — || March 17, 1993 || La Silla || UESAC || JUN || align=right | 2.1 km || 
|-id=463 bgcolor=#E9E9E9
| 129463 ||  || — || March 17, 1993 || La Silla || UESAC || — || align=right | 1.6 km || 
|-id=464 bgcolor=#fefefe
| 129464 ||  || — || March 21, 1993 || La Silla || UESAC || — || align=right | 1.3 km || 
|-id=465 bgcolor=#E9E9E9
| 129465 ||  || — || March 19, 1993 || La Silla || UESAC || — || align=right | 4.7 km || 
|-id=466 bgcolor=#E9E9E9
| 129466 ||  || — || March 19, 1993 || La Silla || UESAC || — || align=right | 2.6 km || 
|-id=467 bgcolor=#E9E9E9
| 129467 ||  || — || March 19, 1993 || La Silla || UESAC || — || align=right | 3.6 km || 
|-id=468 bgcolor=#fefefe
| 129468 ||  || — || March 17, 1993 || La Silla || UESAC || FLO || align=right | 1.0 km || 
|-id=469 bgcolor=#E9E9E9
| 129469 ||  || — || March 21, 1993 || La Silla || UESAC || — || align=right | 2.4 km || 
|-id=470 bgcolor=#FA8072
| 129470 || 1993 KC || — || May 20, 1993 || Kitt Peak || Spacewatch || — || align=right | 1.8 km || 
|-id=471 bgcolor=#E9E9E9
| 129471 ||  || — || July 20, 1993 || La Silla || E. W. Elst || — || align=right | 4.5 km || 
|-id=472 bgcolor=#d6d6d6
| 129472 ||  || — || August 15, 1993 || Caussols || E. W. Elst || — || align=right | 4.7 km || 
|-id=473 bgcolor=#fefefe
| 129473 || 1993 TK || — || October 10, 1993 || Stroncone || A. Vagnozzi || ERI || align=right | 2.4 km || 
|-id=474 bgcolor=#E9E9E9
| 129474 ||  || — || October 9, 1993 || La Silla || E. W. Elst || — || align=right | 4.3 km || 
|-id=475 bgcolor=#fefefe
| 129475 ||  || — || October 9, 1993 || La Silla || E. W. Elst || — || align=right | 1.00 km || 
|-id=476 bgcolor=#fefefe
| 129476 ||  || — || October 9, 1993 || La Silla || E. W. Elst || V || align=right | 1.2 km || 
|-id=477 bgcolor=#d6d6d6
| 129477 ||  || — || October 9, 1993 || La Silla || E. W. Elst || — || align=right | 4.2 km || 
|-id=478 bgcolor=#d6d6d6
| 129478 ||  || — || October 9, 1993 || La Silla || E. W. Elst || — || align=right | 3.6 km || 
|-id=479 bgcolor=#d6d6d6
| 129479 ||  || — || October 9, 1993 || La Silla || E. W. Elst || KOR || align=right | 2.8 km || 
|-id=480 bgcolor=#d6d6d6
| 129480 ||  || — || October 20, 1993 || La Silla || E. W. Elst || — || align=right | 3.5 km || 
|-id=481 bgcolor=#E9E9E9
| 129481 ||  || — || February 8, 1994 || La Silla || E. W. Elst || — || align=right | 3.8 km || 
|-id=482 bgcolor=#d6d6d6
| 129482 ||  || — || April 6, 1994 || Kitt Peak || Spacewatch || VER || align=right | 5.3 km || 
|-id=483 bgcolor=#E9E9E9
| 129483 ||  || — || April 15, 1994 || Kitt Peak || Spacewatch || EUN || align=right | 2.7 km || 
|-id=484 bgcolor=#E9E9E9
| 129484 ||  || — || August 10, 1994 || La Silla || E. W. Elst || — || align=right | 2.7 km || 
|-id=485 bgcolor=#E9E9E9
| 129485 ||  || — || August 12, 1994 || La Silla || E. W. Elst || — || align=right | 1.6 km || 
|-id=486 bgcolor=#E9E9E9
| 129486 ||  || — || August 12, 1994 || La Silla || E. W. Elst || — || align=right | 2.4 km || 
|-id=487 bgcolor=#E9E9E9
| 129487 ||  || — || September 3, 1994 || La Silla || E. W. Elst || — || align=right | 2.5 km || 
|-id=488 bgcolor=#E9E9E9
| 129488 ||  || — || September 28, 1994 || Kitt Peak || Spacewatch || DOR || align=right | 5.4 km || 
|-id=489 bgcolor=#E9E9E9
| 129489 ||  || — || October 4, 1994 || Kitt Peak || Spacewatch || AGN || align=right | 2.3 km || 
|-id=490 bgcolor=#E9E9E9
| 129490 ||  || — || October 9, 1994 || Kitt Peak || Spacewatch || JUN || align=right | 4.3 km || 
|-id=491 bgcolor=#E9E9E9
| 129491 ||  || — || October 10, 1994 || Kitt Peak || Spacewatch || ADE || align=right | 5.4 km || 
|-id=492 bgcolor=#E9E9E9
| 129492 ||  || — || October 11, 1994 || Kitt Peak || Spacewatch || — || align=right | 4.1 km || 
|-id=493 bgcolor=#FA8072
| 129493 ||  || — || January 29, 1995 || Siding Spring || R. H. McNaught || PHO || align=right | 2.3 km || 
|-id=494 bgcolor=#fefefe
| 129494 ||  || — || January 31, 1995 || Kitt Peak || Spacewatch || — || align=right | 1.7 km || 
|-id=495 bgcolor=#fefefe
| 129495 ||  || — || February 24, 1995 || Kitt Peak || Spacewatch || NYS || align=right | 1.0 km || 
|-id=496 bgcolor=#fefefe
| 129496 || 1995 EK || — || March 5, 1995 || Oizumi || T. Kobayashi || — || align=right | 3.3 km || 
|-id=497 bgcolor=#d6d6d6
| 129497 ||  || — || March 23, 1995 || Kitt Peak || Spacewatch || — || align=right | 3.2 km || 
|-id=498 bgcolor=#d6d6d6
| 129498 ||  || — || March 23, 1995 || Kitt Peak || Spacewatch || ANF || align=right | 2.1 km || 
|-id=499 bgcolor=#fefefe
| 129499 ||  || — || March 23, 1995 || Kitt Peak || Spacewatch || — || align=right | 1.5 km || 
|-id=500 bgcolor=#d6d6d6
| 129500 ||  || — || April 2, 1995 || Kitt Peak || Spacewatch || — || align=right | 5.0 km || 
|}

129501–129600 

|-bgcolor=#fefefe
| 129501 ||  || — || April 28, 1995 || Kitt Peak || Spacewatch || — || align=right | 1.7 km || 
|-id=502 bgcolor=#d6d6d6
| 129502 ||  || — || June 29, 1995 || Kitt Peak || Spacewatch || VER || align=right | 4.4 km || 
|-id=503 bgcolor=#fefefe
| 129503 ||  || — || July 24, 1995 || Church Stretton || S. P. Laurie || — || align=right | 1.9 km || 
|-id=504 bgcolor=#fefefe
| 129504 ||  || — || September 17, 1995 || Kitt Peak || Spacewatch || NYS || align=right | 1.0 km || 
|-id=505 bgcolor=#E9E9E9
| 129505 ||  || — || September 19, 1995 || Kitt Peak || Spacewatch || — || align=right | 2.3 km || 
|-id=506 bgcolor=#E9E9E9
| 129506 ||  || — || September 21, 1995 || Kitt Peak || Spacewatch || — || align=right | 1.6 km || 
|-id=507 bgcolor=#E9E9E9
| 129507 ||  || — || September 26, 1995 || Kitt Peak || Spacewatch || MIS || align=right | 3.9 km || 
|-id=508 bgcolor=#E9E9E9
| 129508 ||  || — || September 29, 1995 || Kitt Peak || Spacewatch || — || align=right | 1.8 km || 
|-id=509 bgcolor=#E9E9E9
| 129509 ||  || — || September 29, 1995 || Kitt Peak || Spacewatch || — || align=right | 2.0 km || 
|-id=510 bgcolor=#E9E9E9
| 129510 ||  || — || September 25, 1995 || Kitt Peak || Spacewatch || — || align=right | 1.9 km || 
|-id=511 bgcolor=#fefefe
| 129511 ||  || — || October 15, 1995 || Kitt Peak || Spacewatch || NYS || align=right | 1.3 km || 
|-id=512 bgcolor=#E9E9E9
| 129512 ||  || — || October 21, 1995 || Ondřejov || P. Pravec || — || align=right | 2.3 km || 
|-id=513 bgcolor=#E9E9E9
| 129513 ||  || — || October 16, 1995 || Kitt Peak || Spacewatch || — || align=right | 2.4 km || 
|-id=514 bgcolor=#E9E9E9
| 129514 ||  || — || October 17, 1995 || Kitt Peak || Spacewatch || — || align=right | 1.1 km || 
|-id=515 bgcolor=#E9E9E9
| 129515 ||  || — || October 18, 1995 || Kitt Peak || Spacewatch || — || align=right | 2.1 km || 
|-id=516 bgcolor=#E9E9E9
| 129516 ||  || — || October 19, 1995 || Kitt Peak || Spacewatch || — || align=right | 1.9 km || 
|-id=517 bgcolor=#E9E9E9
| 129517 ||  || — || October 21, 1995 || Kitt Peak || Spacewatch || MAR || align=right | 2.8 km || 
|-id=518 bgcolor=#E9E9E9
| 129518 ||  || — || November 15, 1995 || Kitt Peak || Spacewatch || — || align=right | 3.8 km || 
|-id=519 bgcolor=#E9E9E9
| 129519 ||  || — || November 15, 1995 || Kitt Peak || Spacewatch || — || align=right | 4.9 km || 
|-id=520 bgcolor=#E9E9E9
| 129520 ||  || — || November 21, 1995 || Farra d'Isonzo || Farra d'Isonzo || — || align=right | 1.8 km || 
|-id=521 bgcolor=#E9E9E9
| 129521 ||  || — || November 23, 1995 || Kitt Peak || Spacewatch || — || align=right | 2.2 km || 
|-id=522 bgcolor=#E9E9E9
| 129522 ||  || — || December 14, 1995 || Kitt Peak || Spacewatch || — || align=right | 1.7 km || 
|-id=523 bgcolor=#E9E9E9
| 129523 ||  || — || December 14, 1995 || Kitt Peak || Spacewatch || — || align=right | 2.1 km || 
|-id=524 bgcolor=#E9E9E9
| 129524 ||  || — || December 18, 1995 || Kitt Peak || Spacewatch || — || align=right | 1.0 km || 
|-id=525 bgcolor=#fefefe
| 129525 ||  || — || January 13, 1996 || Kitt Peak || Spacewatch || — || align=right | 1.3 km || 
|-id=526 bgcolor=#E9E9E9
| 129526 ||  || — || January 14, 1996 || Kitt Peak || Spacewatch || WIT || align=right | 1.4 km || 
|-id=527 bgcolor=#E9E9E9
| 129527 ||  || — || January 12, 1996 || Kitt Peak || Spacewatch || — || align=right | 3.7 km || 
|-id=528 bgcolor=#E9E9E9
| 129528 ||  || — || January 19, 1996 || Kitt Peak || Spacewatch || — || align=right | 4.3 km || 
|-id=529 bgcolor=#d6d6d6
| 129529 ||  || — || March 11, 1996 || Kitt Peak || Spacewatch || KOR || align=right | 2.1 km || 
|-id=530 bgcolor=#E9E9E9
| 129530 ||  || — || March 12, 1996 || Kitt Peak || Spacewatch || — || align=right | 4.0 km || 
|-id=531 bgcolor=#d6d6d6
| 129531 ||  || — || March 12, 1996 || Kitt Peak || Spacewatch || — || align=right | 3.6 km || 
|-id=532 bgcolor=#fefefe
| 129532 ||  || — || March 11, 1996 || Kitt Peak || Spacewatch || — || align=right | 1.1 km || 
|-id=533 bgcolor=#d6d6d6
| 129533 ||  || — || March 12, 1996 || Kitt Peak || Spacewatch || KOR || align=right | 1.8 km || 
|-id=534 bgcolor=#d6d6d6
| 129534 ||  || — || April 19, 1996 || Kitt Peak || Spacewatch || BRA || align=right | 3.1 km || 
|-id=535 bgcolor=#d6d6d6
| 129535 ||  || — || April 19, 1996 || Kitt Peak || Spacewatch || — || align=right | 4.7 km || 
|-id=536 bgcolor=#d6d6d6
| 129536 ||  || — || May 11, 1996 || Kitt Peak || Spacewatch || — || align=right | 4.6 km || 
|-id=537 bgcolor=#fefefe
| 129537 ||  || — || May 16, 1996 || Kitt Peak || Spacewatch || — || align=right | 1.5 km || 
|-id=538 bgcolor=#d6d6d6
| 129538 || 1996 NM || — || July 14, 1996 || Haleakala || NEAT || — || align=right | 5.7 km || 
|-id=539 bgcolor=#fefefe
| 129539 ||  || — || July 15, 1996 || Lime Creek || R. Linderholm || — || align=right | 1.5 km || 
|-id=540 bgcolor=#fefefe
| 129540 ||  || — || August 13, 1996 || Haleakala || NEAT || NYS || align=right | 1.2 km || 
|-id=541 bgcolor=#FA8072
| 129541 ||  || — || August 9, 1996 || Nanyo || T. Okuni || — || align=right | 3.2 km || 
|-id=542 bgcolor=#d6d6d6
| 129542 ||  || — || September 15, 1996 || Church Stretton || S. P. Laurie || — || align=right | 9.1 km || 
|-id=543 bgcolor=#fefefe
| 129543 ||  || — || September 14, 1996 || Stroncone || A. Vagnozzi || EUT || align=right | 1.1 km || 
|-id=544 bgcolor=#fefefe
| 129544 ||  || — || September 7, 1996 || Nanyo || T. Okuni || ERI || align=right | 3.6 km || 
|-id=545 bgcolor=#fefefe
| 129545 ||  || — || September 20, 1996 || Kitt Peak || Spacewatch || — || align=right | 1.6 km || 
|-id=546 bgcolor=#fefefe
| 129546 ||  || — || October 3, 1996 || Xinglong || SCAP || H || align=right | 1.5 km || 
|-id=547 bgcolor=#fefefe
| 129547 ||  || — || October 3, 1996 || Xinglong || SCAP || — || align=right | 1.8 km || 
|-id=548 bgcolor=#fefefe
| 129548 ||  || — || October 11, 1996 || Prescott || P. G. Comba || NYS || align=right data-sort-value="0.99" | 990 m || 
|-id=549 bgcolor=#fefefe
| 129549 ||  || — || October 12, 1996 || Kitt Peak || Spacewatch || NYS || align=right | 1.2 km || 
|-id=550 bgcolor=#fefefe
| 129550 Fukuten ||  ||  || October 9, 1996 || Nanyo || T. Okuni || — || align=right | 2.7 km || 
|-id=551 bgcolor=#d6d6d6
| 129551 ||  || — || October 5, 1996 || Kitt Peak || Spacewatch || — || align=right | 5.4 km || 
|-id=552 bgcolor=#fefefe
| 129552 ||  || — || October 7, 1996 || Kitt Peak || Spacewatch || MAS || align=right | 1.1 km || 
|-id=553 bgcolor=#d6d6d6
| 129553 ||  || — || October 7, 1996 || Kitt Peak || Spacewatch || — || align=right | 6.8 km || 
|-id=554 bgcolor=#fefefe
| 129554 ||  || — || October 6, 1996 || La Silla || E. W. Elst || — || align=right | 3.2 km || 
|-id=555 bgcolor=#fefefe
| 129555 Armazones ||  ||  || October 30, 1996 || Colleverde || V. S. Casulli || — || align=right | 1.5 km || 
|-id=556 bgcolor=#fefefe
| 129556 ||  || — || November 15, 1996 || Oizumi || T. Kobayashi || MAS || align=right | 1.4 km || 
|-id=557 bgcolor=#E9E9E9
| 129557 ||  || — || December 2, 1996 || Oizumi || T. Kobayashi || — || align=right | 5.4 km || 
|-id=558 bgcolor=#FA8072
| 129558 ||  || — || December 6, 1996 || Kitt Peak || Spacewatch || — || align=right | 1.1 km || 
|-id=559 bgcolor=#E9E9E9
| 129559 || 1996 YH || — || December 20, 1996 || Oizumi || T. Kobayashi || EUN || align=right | 3.1 km || 
|-id=560 bgcolor=#E9E9E9
| 129560 ||  || — || February 3, 1997 || Kitt Peak || Spacewatch || — || align=right | 1.5 km || 
|-id=561 bgcolor=#E9E9E9
| 129561 Chuhachi ||  ||  || February 9, 1997 || Kuma Kogen || A. Nakamura || — || align=right | 3.6 km || 
|-id=562 bgcolor=#E9E9E9
| 129562 ||  || — || February 4, 1997 || Kitt Peak || Spacewatch || — || align=right | 1.6 km || 
|-id=563 bgcolor=#E9E9E9
| 129563 ||  || — || March 2, 1997 || Kitt Peak || Spacewatch || — || align=right | 2.1 km || 
|-id=564 bgcolor=#E9E9E9
| 129564 Christy ||  ||  || March 7, 1997 || Anderson Mesa || M. W. Buie || MAR || align=right | 1.7 km || 
|-id=565 bgcolor=#E9E9E9
| 129565 ||  || — || April 2, 1997 || Kitt Peak || Spacewatch || HEN || align=right | 1.6 km || 
|-id=566 bgcolor=#E9E9E9
| 129566 ||  || — || April 3, 1997 || Socorro || LINEAR || — || align=right | 3.6 km || 
|-id=567 bgcolor=#E9E9E9
| 129567 ||  || — || April 3, 1997 || Socorro || LINEAR || — || align=right | 5.0 km || 
|-id=568 bgcolor=#E9E9E9
| 129568 ||  || — || April 3, 1997 || Socorro || LINEAR || — || align=right | 3.5 km || 
|-id=569 bgcolor=#E9E9E9
| 129569 ||  || — || April 6, 1997 || Socorro || LINEAR || — || align=right | 5.3 km || 
|-id=570 bgcolor=#E9E9E9
| 129570 ||  || — || April 3, 1997 || Socorro || LINEAR || XIZ || align=right | 2.5 km || 
|-id=571 bgcolor=#E9E9E9
| 129571 ||  || — || April 6, 1997 || Socorro || LINEAR || — || align=right | 3.1 km || 
|-id=572 bgcolor=#E9E9E9
| 129572 ||  || — || April 6, 1997 || Socorro || LINEAR || — || align=right | 4.3 km || 
|-id=573 bgcolor=#E9E9E9
| 129573 ||  || — || April 29, 1997 || Kitt Peak || Spacewatch || — || align=right | 4.0 km || 
|-id=574 bgcolor=#E9E9E9
| 129574 ||  || — || May 2, 1997 || Kitt Peak || Spacewatch || — || align=right | 3.8 km || 
|-id=575 bgcolor=#E9E9E9
| 129575 || 1997 LM || — || June 3, 1997 || Xinglong || SCAP || — || align=right | 5.8 km || 
|-id=576 bgcolor=#fefefe
| 129576 ||  || — || September 4, 1997 || Caussols || ODAS || — || align=right | 1.8 km || 
|-id=577 bgcolor=#fefefe
| 129577 ||  || — || September 9, 1997 || Dynic || A. Sugie || NYS || align=right | 1.2 km || 
|-id=578 bgcolor=#fefefe
| 129578 ||  || — || September 10, 1997 || Bergisch Gladbach || W. Bickel || — || align=right | 1.1 km || 
|-id=579 bgcolor=#fefefe
| 129579 ||  || — || September 21, 1997 || Xinglong || SCAP || PHO || align=right | 1.7 km || 
|-id=580 bgcolor=#E9E9E9
| 129580 ||  || — || September 23, 1997 || Kitt Peak || Spacewatch || — || align=right | 2.7 km || 
|-id=581 bgcolor=#d6d6d6
| 129581 ||  || — || September 23, 1997 || Kitt Peak || Spacewatch || — || align=right | 5.6 km || 
|-id=582 bgcolor=#fefefe
| 129582 ||  || — || September 27, 1997 || Kitt Peak || Spacewatch || FLO || align=right | 1.6 km || 
|-id=583 bgcolor=#C2FFFF
| 129583 ||  || — || September 28, 1997 || Kitt Peak || Spacewatch || L4 || align=right | 15 km || 
|-id=584 bgcolor=#fefefe
| 129584 ||  || — || September 29, 1997 || Needville || W. G. Dillon || NYS || align=right data-sort-value="0.84" | 840 m || 
|-id=585 bgcolor=#fefefe
| 129585 ||  || — || September 29, 1997 || Kitt Peak || Spacewatch || FLO || align=right data-sort-value="0.76" | 760 m || 
|-id=586 bgcolor=#d6d6d6
| 129586 ||  || — || October 3, 1997 || Mallorca || Á. López J., R. Pacheco || — || align=right | 7.1 km || 
|-id=587 bgcolor=#fefefe
| 129587 ||  || — || October 4, 1997 || Kitt Peak || Spacewatch || — || align=right data-sort-value="0.95" | 950 m || 
|-id=588 bgcolor=#fefefe
| 129588 ||  || — || October 4, 1997 || Kitt Peak || Spacewatch || FLO || align=right | 1.7 km || 
|-id=589 bgcolor=#fefefe
| 129589 || 1997 UD || — || October 20, 1997 || Prescott || P. G. Comba || — || align=right | 1.7 km || 
|-id=590 bgcolor=#d6d6d6
| 129590 || 1997 UN || — || October 19, 1997 || Kleť || Kleť Obs. || EOS || align=right | 4.6 km || 
|-id=591 bgcolor=#fefefe
| 129591 ||  || — || October 23, 1997 || Kitt Peak || Spacewatch || NYS || align=right | 1.0 km || 
|-id=592 bgcolor=#fefefe
| 129592 ||  || — || October 30, 1997 || Bergisch Gladbach || W. Bickel || — || align=right | 1.4 km || 
|-id=593 bgcolor=#d6d6d6
| 129593 ||  || — || October 27, 1997 || Bergisch Gladbach || W. Bickel || — || align=right | 5.3 km || 
|-id=594 bgcolor=#fefefe
| 129594 ||  || — || October 25, 1997 || La Silla || UDTS || — || align=right | 1.2 km || 
|-id=595 bgcolor=#fefefe
| 129595 Vand || 1997 VD ||  || November 2, 1997 || Kleť || J. Tichá, M. Tichý || NYS || align=right | 1.1 km || 
|-id=596 bgcolor=#fefefe
| 129596 ||  || — || November 2, 1997 || Nanyo || T. Okuni || PHO || align=right | 4.4 km || 
|-id=597 bgcolor=#fefefe
| 129597 ||  || — || November 4, 1997 || Kleť || Kleť Obs. || FLO || align=right | 1.2 km || 
|-id=598 bgcolor=#fefefe
| 129598 ||  || — || November 6, 1997 || Oizumi || T. Kobayashi || — || align=right | 2.0 km || 
|-id=599 bgcolor=#fefefe
| 129599 ||  || — || November 6, 1997 || Xinglong || SCAP || NYS || align=right | 2.8 km || 
|-id=600 bgcolor=#fefefe
| 129600 ||  || — || November 19, 1997 || Chichibu || N. Satō || FLO || align=right | 1.7 km || 
|}

129601–129700 

|-bgcolor=#fefefe
| 129601 ||  || — || November 21, 1997 || Kitt Peak || Spacewatch || — || align=right | 1.8 km || 
|-id=602 bgcolor=#C2FFFF
| 129602 ||  || — || November 22, 1997 || Kitt Peak || Spacewatch || L4 || align=right | 16 km || 
|-id=603 bgcolor=#fefefe
| 129603 ||  || — || November 22, 1997 || Kitt Peak || Spacewatch || NYS || align=right | 1.2 km || 
|-id=604 bgcolor=#fefefe
| 129604 ||  || — || November 23, 1997 || Kitt Peak || Spacewatch || MAS || align=right data-sort-value="0.94" | 940 m || 
|-id=605 bgcolor=#d6d6d6
| 129605 ||  || — || November 30, 1997 || Kitt Peak || Spacewatch || VER || align=right | 4.2 km || 
|-id=606 bgcolor=#fefefe
| 129606 ||  || — || November 26, 1997 || La Silla || UDTS || NYS || align=right | 2.4 km || 
|-id=607 bgcolor=#fefefe
| 129607 ||  || — || November 30, 1997 || La Silla || UDTS || NYS || align=right | 1.0 km || 
|-id=608 bgcolor=#fefefe
| 129608 ||  || — || December 24, 1997 || Stroncone || Santa Lucia Obs. || NYS || align=right | 1.0 km || 
|-id=609 bgcolor=#E9E9E9
| 129609 ||  || — || December 31, 1997 || Nachi-Katsuura || Y. Shimizu, T. Urata || — || align=right | 1.8 km || 
|-id=610 bgcolor=#fefefe
| 129610 ||  || — || January 5, 1998 || Oizumi || T. Kobayashi || — || align=right | 1.8 km || 
|-id=611 bgcolor=#fefefe
| 129611 ||  || — || January 1, 1998 || Kitt Peak || Spacewatch || NYS || align=right | 1.8 km || 
|-id=612 bgcolor=#fefefe
| 129612 ||  || — || January 1, 1998 || Kitt Peak || Spacewatch || NYS || align=right | 1.0 km || 
|-id=613 bgcolor=#fefefe
| 129613 ||  || — || January 24, 1998 || Oizumi || T. Kobayashi || — || align=right | 1.4 km || 
|-id=614 bgcolor=#E9E9E9
| 129614 ||  || — || January 28, 1998 || Oizumi || T. Kobayashi || — || align=right | 3.1 km || 
|-id=615 bgcolor=#fefefe
| 129615 ||  || — || January 18, 1998 || Kitt Peak || Spacewatch || V || align=right | 1.2 km || 
|-id=616 bgcolor=#fefefe
| 129616 ||  || — || January 22, 1998 || Kitt Peak || Spacewatch || — || align=right | 3.0 km || 
|-id=617 bgcolor=#fefefe
| 129617 ||  || — || January 30, 1998 || Modra || P. Kolény, L. Kornoš || SUL || align=right | 2.5 km || 
|-id=618 bgcolor=#fefefe
| 129618 ||  || — || February 24, 1998 || Haleakala || NEAT || — || align=right | 2.1 km || 
|-id=619 bgcolor=#fefefe
| 129619 ||  || — || February 23, 1998 || Kitt Peak || Spacewatch || V || align=right | 1.4 km || 
|-id=620 bgcolor=#E9E9E9
| 129620 ||  || — || March 1, 1998 || Xinglong || SCAP || — || align=right | 1.6 km || 
|-id=621 bgcolor=#fefefe
| 129621 ||  || — || March 2, 1998 || Kitt Peak || Spacewatch || NYS || align=right | 1.8 km || 
|-id=622 bgcolor=#fefefe
| 129622 ||  || — || March 22, 1998 || Kitt Peak || Spacewatch || V || align=right | 1.2 km || 
|-id=623 bgcolor=#fefefe
| 129623 ||  || — || March 20, 1998 || Socorro || LINEAR || NYS || align=right | 1.5 km || 
|-id=624 bgcolor=#E9E9E9
| 129624 ||  || — || March 20, 1998 || Socorro || LINEAR || MIT || align=right | 4.1 km || 
|-id=625 bgcolor=#E9E9E9
| 129625 ||  || — || March 20, 1998 || Socorro || LINEAR || — || align=right | 2.2 km || 
|-id=626 bgcolor=#fefefe
| 129626 ||  || — || April 20, 1998 || Socorro || LINEAR || H || align=right | 1.1 km || 
|-id=627 bgcolor=#fefefe
| 129627 ||  || — || April 21, 1998 || Socorro || LINEAR || H || align=right | 1.2 km || 
|-id=628 bgcolor=#E9E9E9
| 129628 ||  || — || April 19, 1998 || Kitt Peak || Spacewatch || HNS || align=right | 1.9 km || 
|-id=629 bgcolor=#fefefe
| 129629 ||  || — || April 22, 1998 || Socorro || LINEAR || H || align=right data-sort-value="0.98" | 980 m || 
|-id=630 bgcolor=#E9E9E9
| 129630 ||  || — || April 20, 1998 || Socorro || LINEAR || — || align=right | 1.6 km || 
|-id=631 bgcolor=#E9E9E9
| 129631 ||  || — || April 20, 1998 || Socorro || LINEAR || — || align=right | 2.1 km || 
|-id=632 bgcolor=#E9E9E9
| 129632 ||  || — || April 20, 1998 || Socorro || LINEAR || — || align=right | 1.5 km || 
|-id=633 bgcolor=#E9E9E9
| 129633 ||  || — || April 20, 1998 || Socorro || LINEAR || — || align=right | 1.9 km || 
|-id=634 bgcolor=#d6d6d6
| 129634 ||  || — || April 20, 1998 || Socorro || LINEAR || 3:2 || align=right | 8.2 km || 
|-id=635 bgcolor=#fefefe
| 129635 ||  || — || April 21, 1998 || Socorro || LINEAR || NYS || align=right | 1.4 km || 
|-id=636 bgcolor=#E9E9E9
| 129636 ||  || — || April 21, 1998 || Socorro || LINEAR || — || align=right | 2.5 km || 
|-id=637 bgcolor=#E9E9E9
| 129637 ||  || — || April 21, 1998 || Socorro || LINEAR || — || align=right | 1.7 km || 
|-id=638 bgcolor=#fefefe
| 129638 ||  || — || April 20, 1998 || Socorro || LINEAR || — || align=right | 1.6 km || 
|-id=639 bgcolor=#E9E9E9
| 129639 ||  || — || April 20, 1998 || Kitt Peak || Spacewatch || — || align=right | 2.0 km || 
|-id=640 bgcolor=#E9E9E9
| 129640 ||  || — || May 19, 1998 || Kitt Peak || Spacewatch || — || align=right | 1.7 km || 
|-id=641 bgcolor=#fefefe
| 129641 ||  || — || May 22, 1998 || Kitt Peak || Spacewatch || — || align=right | 2.2 km || 
|-id=642 bgcolor=#E9E9E9
| 129642 ||  || — || May 19, 1998 || Kitt Peak || Spacewatch || MAR || align=right | 2.0 km || 
|-id=643 bgcolor=#fefefe
| 129643 ||  || — || May 22, 1998 || Socorro || LINEAR || H || align=right | 1.0 km || 
|-id=644 bgcolor=#E9E9E9
| 129644 ||  || — || May 23, 1998 || Anderson Mesa || LONEOS || — || align=right | 1.3 km || 
|-id=645 bgcolor=#fefefe
| 129645 ||  || — || May 22, 1998 || Socorro || LINEAR || — || align=right | 1.6 km || 
|-id=646 bgcolor=#E9E9E9
| 129646 ||  || — || May 27, 1998 || Kitt Peak || Spacewatch || — || align=right | 7.1 km || 
|-id=647 bgcolor=#E9E9E9
| 129647 ||  || — || June 1, 1998 || La Silla || E. W. Elst || RAF || align=right | 2.0 km || 
|-id=648 bgcolor=#d6d6d6
| 129648 ||  || — || June 18, 1998 || Kitt Peak || Spacewatch || — || align=right | 4.9 km || 
|-id=649 bgcolor=#E9E9E9
| 129649 ||  || — || June 18, 1998 || Mallorca || Á. López J., R. Pacheco || — || align=right | 3.8 km || 
|-id=650 bgcolor=#E9E9E9
| 129650 ||  || — || June 19, 1998 || Socorro || LINEAR || EUN || align=right | 2.0 km || 
|-id=651 bgcolor=#E9E9E9
| 129651 ||  || — || June 25, 1998 || Kitt Peak || Spacewatch || — || align=right | 2.4 km || 
|-id=652 bgcolor=#E9E9E9
| 129652 ||  || — || July 24, 1998 || Caussols || ODAS || — || align=right | 2.8 km || 
|-id=653 bgcolor=#fefefe
| 129653 ||  || — || August 17, 1998 || Socorro || LINEAR || H || align=right | 1.7 km || 
|-id=654 bgcolor=#E9E9E9
| 129654 ||  || — || August 17, 1998 || Socorro || LINEAR || — || align=right | 3.5 km || 
|-id=655 bgcolor=#E9E9E9
| 129655 ||  || — || August 20, 1998 || Anderson Mesa || LONEOS || — || align=right | 2.9 km || 
|-id=656 bgcolor=#E9E9E9
| 129656 ||  || — || August 17, 1998 || Socorro || LINEAR || MIT || align=right | 4.1 km || 
|-id=657 bgcolor=#E9E9E9
| 129657 ||  || — || August 17, 1998 || Socorro || LINEAR || MIT || align=right | 3.6 km || 
|-id=658 bgcolor=#E9E9E9
| 129658 ||  || — || August 17, 1998 || Socorro || LINEAR || VIB || align=right | 3.3 km || 
|-id=659 bgcolor=#E9E9E9
| 129659 ||  || — || August 17, 1998 || Socorro || LINEAR || GEF || align=right | 2.5 km || 
|-id=660 bgcolor=#d6d6d6
| 129660 ||  || — || August 17, 1998 || Socorro || LINEAR || EUP || align=right | 6.7 km || 
|-id=661 bgcolor=#E9E9E9
| 129661 ||  || — || August 27, 1998 || Anderson Mesa || LONEOS || — || align=right | 2.6 km || 
|-id=662 bgcolor=#d6d6d6
| 129662 ||  || — || August 30, 1998 || Kitt Peak || Spacewatch || KOR || align=right | 1.9 km || 
|-id=663 bgcolor=#E9E9E9
| 129663 ||  || — || August 30, 1998 || Kitt Peak || Spacewatch || — || align=right | 3.4 km || 
|-id=664 bgcolor=#E9E9E9
| 129664 ||  || — || August 24, 1998 || Socorro || LINEAR || — || align=right | 6.1 km || 
|-id=665 bgcolor=#E9E9E9
| 129665 ||  || — || August 24, 1998 || Socorro || LINEAR || JUN || align=right | 1.5 km || 
|-id=666 bgcolor=#fefefe
| 129666 ||  || — || August 24, 1998 || Socorro || LINEAR || H || align=right | 1.2 km || 
|-id=667 bgcolor=#E9E9E9
| 129667 ||  || — || August 26, 1998 || La Silla || E. W. Elst || — || align=right | 5.7 km || 
|-id=668 bgcolor=#E9E9E9
| 129668 ||  || — || August 28, 1998 || Anderson Mesa || LONEOS || — || align=right | 3.3 km || 
|-id=669 bgcolor=#E9E9E9
| 129669 || 1998 RY || — || September 12, 1998 || Oizumi || T. Kobayashi || — || align=right | 2.1 km || 
|-id=670 bgcolor=#E9E9E9
| 129670 ||  || — || September 12, 1998 || Kitt Peak || Spacewatch || — || align=right | 2.6 km || 
|-id=671 bgcolor=#E9E9E9
| 129671 ||  || — || September 14, 1998 || Socorro || LINEAR || — || align=right | 2.4 km || 
|-id=672 bgcolor=#E9E9E9
| 129672 ||  || — || September 14, 1998 || Socorro || LINEAR || MRX || align=right | 1.8 km || 
|-id=673 bgcolor=#d6d6d6
| 129673 ||  || — || September 14, 1998 || Socorro || LINEAR || BRA || align=right | 2.5 km || 
|-id=674 bgcolor=#E9E9E9
| 129674 ||  || — || September 14, 1998 || Socorro || LINEAR || GEF || align=right | 1.9 km || 
|-id=675 bgcolor=#E9E9E9
| 129675 ||  || — || September 14, 1998 || Socorro || LINEAR || GEF || align=right | 2.0 km || 
|-id=676 bgcolor=#E9E9E9
| 129676 ||  || — || September 14, 1998 || Socorro || LINEAR || — || align=right | 2.1 km || 
|-id=677 bgcolor=#E9E9E9
| 129677 ||  || — || September 14, 1998 || Socorro || LINEAR || — || align=right | 3.1 km || 
|-id=678 bgcolor=#E9E9E9
| 129678 ||  || — || September 14, 1998 || Socorro || LINEAR || — || align=right | 3.2 km || 
|-id=679 bgcolor=#d6d6d6
| 129679 ||  || — || September 14, 1998 || Socorro || LINEAR || — || align=right | 4.8 km || 
|-id=680 bgcolor=#E9E9E9
| 129680 ||  || — || September 14, 1998 || Socorro || LINEAR || HOF || align=right | 4.2 km || 
|-id=681 bgcolor=#E9E9E9
| 129681 ||  || — || September 14, 1998 || Socorro || LINEAR || — || align=right | 4.5 km || 
|-id=682 bgcolor=#E9E9E9
| 129682 ||  || — || September 14, 1998 || Socorro || LINEAR || — || align=right | 1.8 km || 
|-id=683 bgcolor=#E9E9E9
| 129683 ||  || — || September 14, 1998 || Socorro || LINEAR || — || align=right | 5.7 km || 
|-id=684 bgcolor=#E9E9E9
| 129684 ||  || — || September 14, 1998 || Socorro || LINEAR || — || align=right | 3.6 km || 
|-id=685 bgcolor=#d6d6d6
| 129685 ||  || — || September 14, 1998 || Socorro || LINEAR || — || align=right | 3.1 km || 
|-id=686 bgcolor=#d6d6d6
| 129686 ||  || — || September 14, 1998 || Socorro || LINEAR || FIR || align=right | 6.4 km || 
|-id=687 bgcolor=#E9E9E9
| 129687 ||  || — || September 20, 1998 || Kitt Peak || Spacewatch || — || align=right | 1.7 km || 
|-id=688 bgcolor=#d6d6d6
| 129688 ||  || — || September 17, 1998 || Anderson Mesa || LONEOS || — || align=right | 5.1 km || 
|-id=689 bgcolor=#d6d6d6
| 129689 ||  || — || September 16, 1998 || Kitt Peak || Spacewatch || KOR || align=right | 2.8 km || 
|-id=690 bgcolor=#d6d6d6
| 129690 ||  || — || September 16, 1998 || Kitt Peak || Spacewatch || — || align=right | 4.4 km || 
|-id=691 bgcolor=#d6d6d6
| 129691 ||  || — || September 16, 1998 || Kitt Peak || Spacewatch || KAR || align=right | 1.7 km || 
|-id=692 bgcolor=#E9E9E9
| 129692 ||  || — || September 22, 1998 || Anderson Mesa || LONEOS || — || align=right | 3.2 km || 
|-id=693 bgcolor=#d6d6d6
| 129693 ||  || — || September 23, 1998 || Kitt Peak || Spacewatch || EOS || align=right | 3.4 km || 
|-id=694 bgcolor=#E9E9E9
| 129694 ||  || — || September 25, 1998 || Kitt Peak || Spacewatch || — || align=right | 4.0 km || 
|-id=695 bgcolor=#fefefe
| 129695 ||  || — || September 25, 1998 || Kitt Peak || Spacewatch || — || align=right data-sort-value="0.95" | 950 m || 
|-id=696 bgcolor=#E9E9E9
| 129696 ||  || — || September 19, 1998 || Anderson Mesa || LONEOS || — || align=right | 2.4 km || 
|-id=697 bgcolor=#E9E9E9
| 129697 ||  || — || September 19, 1998 || Socorro || LINEAR || — || align=right | 2.8 km || 
|-id=698 bgcolor=#E9E9E9
| 129698 ||  || — || September 26, 1998 || Socorro || LINEAR || HOF || align=right | 6.6 km || 
|-id=699 bgcolor=#d6d6d6
| 129699 ||  || — || September 26, 1998 || Socorro || LINEAR || CHA || align=right | 3.8 km || 
|-id=700 bgcolor=#d6d6d6
| 129700 ||  || — || September 26, 1998 || Socorro || LINEAR || HYG || align=right | 4.5 km || 
|}

129701–129800 

|-bgcolor=#d6d6d6
| 129701 ||  || — || September 26, 1998 || Socorro || LINEAR || KOR || align=right | 2.6 km || 
|-id=702 bgcolor=#E9E9E9
| 129702 ||  || — || September 26, 1998 || Socorro || LINEAR || — || align=right | 4.2 km || 
|-id=703 bgcolor=#E9E9E9
| 129703 ||  || — || September 26, 1998 || Socorro || LINEAR || — || align=right | 5.3 km || 
|-id=704 bgcolor=#d6d6d6
| 129704 ||  || — || September 26, 1998 || Socorro || LINEAR || TIR || align=right | 6.5 km || 
|-id=705 bgcolor=#E9E9E9
| 129705 ||  || — || September 26, 1998 || Socorro || LINEAR || MIT || align=right | 6.1 km || 
|-id=706 bgcolor=#d6d6d6
| 129706 ||  || — || September 18, 1998 || La Silla || E. W. Elst || — || align=right | 4.0 km || 
|-id=707 bgcolor=#d6d6d6
| 129707 ||  || — || September 20, 1998 || La Silla || E. W. Elst || KOR || align=right | 3.5 km || 
|-id=708 bgcolor=#E9E9E9
| 129708 ||  || — || September 26, 1998 || Socorro || LINEAR || — || align=right | 1.2 km || 
|-id=709 bgcolor=#d6d6d6
| 129709 ||  || — || September 26, 1998 || Socorro || LINEAR || — || align=right | 4.0 km || 
|-id=710 bgcolor=#E9E9E9
| 129710 ||  || — || September 26, 1998 || Socorro || LINEAR || AGN || align=right | 2.2 km || 
|-id=711 bgcolor=#E9E9E9
| 129711 ||  || — || September 16, 1998 || Anderson Mesa || LONEOS || — || align=right | 2.0 km || 
|-id=712 bgcolor=#E9E9E9
| 129712 ||  || — || October 14, 1998 || Socorro || LINEAR || — || align=right | 4.2 km || 
|-id=713 bgcolor=#E9E9E9
| 129713 ||  || — || October 13, 1998 || Kitt Peak || Spacewatch || — || align=right | 5.0 km || 
|-id=714 bgcolor=#d6d6d6
| 129714 ||  || — || October 14, 1998 || Xinglong || SCAP || EOS || align=right | 3.7 km || 
|-id=715 bgcolor=#E9E9E9
| 129715 ||  || — || October 14, 1998 || Kitt Peak || Spacewatch || HNA || align=right | 3.9 km || 
|-id=716 bgcolor=#d6d6d6
| 129716 ||  || — || October 15, 1998 || Kitt Peak || Spacewatch || — || align=right | 3.9 km || 
|-id=717 bgcolor=#d6d6d6
| 129717 ||  || — || October 14, 1998 || Anderson Mesa || LONEOS || KOR || align=right | 3.3 km || 
|-id=718 bgcolor=#d6d6d6
| 129718 ||  || — || October 23, 1998 || Kitt Peak || Spacewatch || CHA || align=right | 3.3 km || 
|-id=719 bgcolor=#d6d6d6
| 129719 ||  || — || October 23, 1998 || Kitt Peak || Spacewatch || — || align=right | 2.8 km || 
|-id=720 bgcolor=#E9E9E9
| 129720 ||  || — || October 18, 1998 || La Silla || E. W. Elst || — || align=right | 3.5 km || 
|-id=721 bgcolor=#d6d6d6
| 129721 ||  || — || November 10, 1998 || Caussols || ODAS || KOR || align=right | 2.2 km || 
|-id=722 bgcolor=#d6d6d6
| 129722 ||  || — || November 10, 1998 || Socorro || LINEAR || — || align=right | 5.3 km || 
|-id=723 bgcolor=#E9E9E9
| 129723 ||  || — || November 10, 1998 || Socorro || LINEAR || TIN || align=right | 2.1 km || 
|-id=724 bgcolor=#d6d6d6
| 129724 ||  || — || November 11, 1998 || Caussols || ODAS || — || align=right | 4.7 km || 
|-id=725 bgcolor=#d6d6d6
| 129725 ||  || — || November 14, 1998 || Uenohara || N. Kawasato || — || align=right | 4.9 km || 
|-id=726 bgcolor=#E9E9E9
| 129726 ||  || — || November 10, 1998 || Socorro || LINEAR || — || align=right | 3.9 km || 
|-id=727 bgcolor=#d6d6d6
| 129727 ||  || — || November 11, 1998 || Socorro || LINEAR || — || align=right | 4.8 km || 
|-id=728 bgcolor=#E9E9E9
| 129728 ||  || — || November 16, 1998 || Socorro || LINEAR || GER || align=right | 4.6 km || 
|-id=729 bgcolor=#E9E9E9
| 129729 ||  || — || November 21, 1998 || Socorro || LINEAR || — || align=right | 5.0 km || 
|-id=730 bgcolor=#E9E9E9
| 129730 ||  || — || November 18, 1998 || Socorro || LINEAR || — || align=right | 2.9 km || 
|-id=731 bgcolor=#d6d6d6
| 129731 ||  || — || November 18, 1998 || Kitt Peak || Spacewatch || THM || align=right | 6.3 km || 
|-id=732 bgcolor=#d6d6d6
| 129732 ||  || — || November 23, 1998 || Anderson Mesa || LONEOS || — || align=right | 6.6 km || 
|-id=733 bgcolor=#d6d6d6
| 129733 ||  || — || December 15, 1998 || Caussols || ODAS || — || align=right | 8.1 km || 
|-id=734 bgcolor=#E9E9E9
| 129734 ||  || — || December 12, 1998 || Kitt Peak || Spacewatch || — || align=right | 5.1 km || 
|-id=735 bgcolor=#fefefe
| 129735 || 1998 YU || — || December 16, 1998 || Oizumi || T. Kobayashi || — || align=right | 1.7 km || 
|-id=736 bgcolor=#fefefe
| 129736 ||  || — || December 26, 1998 || Kitt Peak || Spacewatch || — || align=right | 1.2 km || 
|-id=737 bgcolor=#FA8072
| 129737 ||  || — || January 9, 1999 || Xinglong || SCAP || — || align=right | 1.4 km || 
|-id=738 bgcolor=#E9E9E9
| 129738 || 1999 BT || — || January 16, 1999 || Višnjan Observatory || K. Korlević || — || align=right | 6.7 km || 
|-id=739 bgcolor=#fefefe
| 129739 ||  || — || February 12, 1999 || Kitt Peak || Spacewatch || — || align=right | 1.6 km || 
|-id=740 bgcolor=#fefefe
| 129740 ||  || — || February 10, 1999 || Socorro || LINEAR || FLO || align=right | 1.8 km || 
|-id=741 bgcolor=#fefefe
| 129741 ||  || — || February 10, 1999 || Socorro || LINEAR || — || align=right | 2.4 km || 
|-id=742 bgcolor=#E9E9E9
| 129742 ||  || — || February 12, 1999 || Socorro || LINEAR || — || align=right | 5.5 km || 
|-id=743 bgcolor=#fefefe
| 129743 Grimaldi ||  ||  || February 15, 1999 || Monte Agliale || S. Donati || — || align=right | 1.3 km || 
|-id=744 bgcolor=#fefefe
| 129744 ||  || — || February 12, 1999 || Socorro || LINEAR || — || align=right | 2.1 km || 
|-id=745 bgcolor=#fefefe
| 129745 ||  || — || February 12, 1999 || Socorro || LINEAR || — || align=right | 1.6 km || 
|-id=746 bgcolor=#C2E0FF
| 129746 ||  || — || February 10, 1999 || Mauna Kea || J. X. Luu, C. Trujillo, D. C. Jewitt || plutinocritical || align=right | 94 km || 
|-id=747 bgcolor=#fefefe
| 129747 ||  || — || February 7, 1999 || Kitt Peak || Spacewatch || — || align=right | 1.2 km || 
|-id=748 bgcolor=#fefefe
| 129748 ||  || — || February 8, 1999 || Kitt Peak || Spacewatch || FLO || align=right | 1.3 km || 
|-id=749 bgcolor=#d6d6d6
| 129749 ||  || — || February 9, 1999 || Kitt Peak || Spacewatch || 7:4 || align=right | 5.1 km || 
|-id=750 bgcolor=#fefefe
| 129750 ||  || — || February 12, 1999 || Kitt Peak || Spacewatch || — || align=right | 1.3 km || 
|-id=751 bgcolor=#fefefe
| 129751 ||  || — || February 8, 1999 || Kitt Peak || Spacewatch || — || align=right | 1.1 km || 
|-id=752 bgcolor=#fefefe
| 129752 ||  || — || February 9, 1999 || Kitt Peak || Spacewatch || — || align=right | 1.0 km || 
|-id=753 bgcolor=#fefefe
| 129753 ||  || — || February 21, 1999 || Gekko || T. Kagawa || FLO || align=right | 2.3 km || 
|-id=754 bgcolor=#fefefe
| 129754 || 1999 EE || — || March 9, 1999 || Prescott || P. G. Comba || — || align=right | 3.6 km || 
|-id=755 bgcolor=#fefefe
| 129755 ||  || — || March 14, 1999 || Kitt Peak || Spacewatch || — || align=right | 1.4 km || 
|-id=756 bgcolor=#fefefe
| 129756 ||  || — || March 9, 1999 || Kitt Peak || Spacewatch || — || align=right | 1.3 km || 
|-id=757 bgcolor=#fefefe
| 129757 ||  || — || March 16, 1999 || Kitt Peak || Spacewatch || — || align=right data-sort-value="0.87" | 870 m || 
|-id=758 bgcolor=#fefefe
| 129758 ||  || — || March 20, 1999 || Socorro || LINEAR || V || align=right | 1.3 km || 
|-id=759 bgcolor=#fefefe
| 129759 ||  || — || March 22, 1999 || Anderson Mesa || LONEOS || — || align=right | 1.3 km || 
|-id=760 bgcolor=#fefefe
| 129760 ||  || — || April 5, 1999 || Majorca || OAM Obs. || — || align=right | 1.3 km || 
|-id=761 bgcolor=#fefefe
| 129761 ||  || — || April 14, 1999 || Višnjan Observatory || K. Korlević || — || align=right | 4.0 km || 
|-id=762 bgcolor=#fefefe
| 129762 ||  || — || April 11, 1999 || Kitt Peak || Spacewatch || — || align=right | 1.3 km || 
|-id=763 bgcolor=#fefefe
| 129763 ||  || — || April 11, 1999 || Kitt Peak || Spacewatch || FLO || align=right | 1.2 km || 
|-id=764 bgcolor=#fefefe
| 129764 ||  || — || April 6, 1999 || Socorro || LINEAR || ERI || align=right | 4.1 km || 
|-id=765 bgcolor=#fefefe
| 129765 ||  || — || April 7, 1999 || Socorro || LINEAR || — || align=right | 1.7 km || 
|-id=766 bgcolor=#fefefe
| 129766 ||  || — || April 12, 1999 || Socorro || LINEAR || — || align=right | 1.5 km || 
|-id=767 bgcolor=#fefefe
| 129767 ||  || — || April 11, 1999 || Anderson Mesa || LONEOS || — || align=right | 3.3 km || 
|-id=768 bgcolor=#fefefe
| 129768 ||  || — || April 15, 1999 || Socorro || LINEAR || PHO || align=right | 2.2 km || 
|-id=769 bgcolor=#fefefe
| 129769 || 1999 HN || — || April 17, 1999 || Ondřejov || P. Pravec || — || align=right | 1.5 km || 
|-id=770 bgcolor=#fefefe
| 129770 || 1999 HV || — || April 18, 1999 || Woomera || F. B. Zoltowski || PHO || align=right | 2.6 km || 
|-id=771 bgcolor=#fefefe
| 129771 ||  || — || April 17, 1999 || Socorro || LINEAR || — || align=right | 2.0 km || 
|-id=772 bgcolor=#C2E0FF
| 129772 ||  || — || April 17, 1999 || Kitt Peak || Kitt Peak Obs. || res4:7 || align=right | 161 km || 
|-id=773 bgcolor=#fefefe
| 129773 Catmerrill ||  ||  || May 8, 1999 || Catalina || CSS || — || align=right | 1.4 km || 
|-id=774 bgcolor=#fefefe
| 129774 ||  || — || May 10, 1999 || Socorro || LINEAR || PHO || align=right | 2.1 km || 
|-id=775 bgcolor=#fefefe
| 129775 ||  || — || May 12, 1999 || Socorro || LINEAR || PHO || align=right | 2.7 km || 
|-id=776 bgcolor=#fefefe
| 129776 ||  || — || May 10, 1999 || Socorro || LINEAR || PHO || align=right | 2.3 km || 
|-id=777 bgcolor=#fefefe
| 129777 ||  || — || May 10, 1999 || Socorro || LINEAR || — || align=right | 1.3 km || 
|-id=778 bgcolor=#fefefe
| 129778 ||  || — || May 10, 1999 || Socorro || LINEAR || — || align=right | 1.4 km || 
|-id=779 bgcolor=#fefefe
| 129779 ||  || — || May 10, 1999 || Socorro || LINEAR || — || align=right | 1.6 km || 
|-id=780 bgcolor=#fefefe
| 129780 ||  || — || May 10, 1999 || Socorro || LINEAR || — || align=right | 3.0 km || 
|-id=781 bgcolor=#fefefe
| 129781 ||  || — || May 10, 1999 || Socorro || LINEAR || FLO || align=right | 1.2 km || 
|-id=782 bgcolor=#fefefe
| 129782 ||  || — || May 10, 1999 || Socorro || LINEAR || — || align=right | 2.1 km || 
|-id=783 bgcolor=#fefefe
| 129783 ||  || — || May 10, 1999 || Socorro || LINEAR || — || align=right | 1.7 km || 
|-id=784 bgcolor=#fefefe
| 129784 ||  || — || May 10, 1999 || Socorro || LINEAR || — || align=right | 1.6 km || 
|-id=785 bgcolor=#fefefe
| 129785 ||  || — || May 10, 1999 || Socorro || LINEAR || — || align=right | 2.7 km || 
|-id=786 bgcolor=#fefefe
| 129786 ||  || — || May 10, 1999 || Socorro || LINEAR || — || align=right | 1.7 km || 
|-id=787 bgcolor=#fefefe
| 129787 ||  || — || May 12, 1999 || Socorro || LINEAR || — || align=right | 1.9 km || 
|-id=788 bgcolor=#fefefe
| 129788 ||  || — || May 12, 1999 || Socorro || LINEAR || V || align=right | 1.4 km || 
|-id=789 bgcolor=#fefefe
| 129789 ||  || — || May 10, 1999 || Socorro || LINEAR || FLO || align=right | 1.5 km || 
|-id=790 bgcolor=#fefefe
| 129790 ||  || — || May 13, 1999 || Socorro || LINEAR || V || align=right | 1.8 km || 
|-id=791 bgcolor=#fefefe
| 129791 ||  || — || May 13, 1999 || Socorro || LINEAR || NYS || align=right | 1.0 km || 
|-id=792 bgcolor=#fefefe
| 129792 ||  || — || May 13, 1999 || Socorro || LINEAR || NYS || align=right | 1.1 km || 
|-id=793 bgcolor=#fefefe
| 129793 ||  || — || May 13, 1999 || Socorro || LINEAR || FLO || align=right | 1.1 km || 
|-id=794 bgcolor=#fefefe
| 129794 ||  || — || May 13, 1999 || Socorro || LINEAR || NYS || align=right | 1.1 km || 
|-id=795 bgcolor=#fefefe
| 129795 ||  || — || May 13, 1999 || Socorro || LINEAR || FLO || align=right | 1.5 km || 
|-id=796 bgcolor=#fefefe
| 129796 ||  || — || May 13, 1999 || Socorro || LINEAR || — || align=right | 1.2 km || 
|-id=797 bgcolor=#fefefe
| 129797 ||  || — || May 14, 1999 || Socorro || LINEAR || NYS || align=right | 1.3 km || 
|-id=798 bgcolor=#fefefe
| 129798 ||  || — || May 12, 1999 || Socorro || LINEAR || V || align=right | 1.2 km || 
|-id=799 bgcolor=#fefefe
| 129799 ||  || — || May 13, 1999 || Socorro || LINEAR || — || align=right | 1.5 km || 
|-id=800 bgcolor=#fefefe
| 129800 ||  || — || May 13, 1999 || Socorro || LINEAR || V || align=right | 1.4 km || 
|}

129801–129900 

|-bgcolor=#fefefe
| 129801 Tommcmahon ||  ||  || May 17, 1999 || Catalina || CSS || NYS || align=right data-sort-value="0.99" | 990 m || 
|-id=802 bgcolor=#fefefe
| 129802 ||  || — || May 16, 1999 || Bergisch Gladbach || W. Bickel || — || align=right data-sort-value="0.91" | 910 m || 
|-id=803 bgcolor=#fefefe
| 129803 ||  || — || May 18, 1999 || Socorro || LINEAR || — || align=right | 1.3 km || 
|-id=804 bgcolor=#fefefe
| 129804 ||  || — || May 18, 1999 || Socorro || LINEAR || NYS || align=right | 1.4 km || 
|-id=805 bgcolor=#fefefe
| 129805 ||  || — || May 18, 1999 || Socorro || LINEAR || NYS || align=right | 1.2 km || 
|-id=806 bgcolor=#fefefe
| 129806 ||  || — || May 18, 1999 || Socorro || LINEAR || NYS || align=right | 2.3 km || 
|-id=807 bgcolor=#fefefe
| 129807 Stefanodougherty ||  ||  || May 17, 1999 || Catalina || CSS || NYS || align=right | 1.3 km || 
|-id=808 bgcolor=#fefefe
| 129808 ||  || — || May 17, 1999 || Socorro || LINEAR || — || align=right | 2.7 km || 
|-id=809 bgcolor=#fefefe
| 129809 ||  || — || June 9, 1999 || Socorro || LINEAR || NYS || align=right | 1.4 km || 
|-id=810 bgcolor=#fefefe
| 129810 ||  || — || June 9, 1999 || Socorro || LINEAR || — || align=right | 2.3 km || 
|-id=811 bgcolor=#fefefe
| 129811 Stacyoliver ||  ||  || June 11, 1999 || Catalina || CSS || FLO || align=right | 1.1 km || 
|-id=812 bgcolor=#fefefe
| 129812 ||  || — || June 23, 1999 || Woomera || F. B. Zoltowski || NYS || align=right | 1.3 km || 
|-id=813 bgcolor=#FA8072
| 129813 || 1999 NJ || — || July 6, 1999 || Reedy Creek || J. Broughton || — || align=right | 1.2 km || 
|-id=814 bgcolor=#fefefe
| 129814 ||  || — || July 13, 1999 || Socorro || LINEAR || NYS || align=right | 1.4 km || 
|-id=815 bgcolor=#fefefe
| 129815 ||  || — || July 13, 1999 || Socorro || LINEAR || — || align=right | 2.0 km || 
|-id=816 bgcolor=#fefefe
| 129816 ||  || — || July 14, 1999 || Socorro || LINEAR || — || align=right | 1.6 km || 
|-id=817 bgcolor=#fefefe
| 129817 ||  || — || July 14, 1999 || Socorro || LINEAR || — || align=right | 1.6 km || 
|-id=818 bgcolor=#fefefe
| 129818 ||  || — || July 14, 1999 || Socorro || LINEAR || ERI || align=right | 2.9 km || 
|-id=819 bgcolor=#fefefe
| 129819 ||  || — || July 14, 1999 || Socorro || LINEAR || NYS || align=right | 1.2 km || 
|-id=820 bgcolor=#fefefe
| 129820 ||  || — || July 12, 1999 || Socorro || LINEAR || — || align=right | 1.6 km || 
|-id=821 bgcolor=#E9E9E9
| 129821 ||  || — || July 12, 1999 || Socorro || LINEAR || — || align=right | 2.6 km || 
|-id=822 bgcolor=#E9E9E9
| 129822 ||  || — || July 12, 1999 || Socorro || LINEAR || — || align=right | 3.2 km || 
|-id=823 bgcolor=#fefefe
| 129823 ||  || — || July 12, 1999 || Socorro || LINEAR || — || align=right | 1.8 km || 
|-id=824 bgcolor=#fefefe
| 129824 ||  || — || July 12, 1999 || Socorro || LINEAR || — || align=right | 1.7 km || 
|-id=825 bgcolor=#E9E9E9
| 129825 ||  || — || July 12, 1999 || Socorro || LINEAR || — || align=right | 4.2 km || 
|-id=826 bgcolor=#E9E9E9
| 129826 ||  || — || July 12, 1999 || Socorro || LINEAR || INO || align=right | 3.2 km || 
|-id=827 bgcolor=#fefefe
| 129827 ||  || — || July 12, 1999 || Socorro || LINEAR || — || align=right | 2.8 km || 
|-id=828 bgcolor=#fefefe
| 129828 ||  || — || August 13, 1999 || Farpoint || G. Hug || H || align=right | 1.3 km || 
|-id=829 bgcolor=#fefefe
| 129829 || 1999 RP || — || September 3, 1999 || Ondřejov || L. Kotková || — || align=right | 1.5 km || 
|-id=830 bgcolor=#fefefe
| 129830 ||  || — || September 4, 1999 || Catalina || CSS || V || align=right | 1.4 km || 
|-id=831 bgcolor=#E9E9E9
| 129831 ||  || — || September 3, 1999 || Kitt Peak || Spacewatch || — || align=right | 1.6 km || 
|-id=832 bgcolor=#fefefe
| 129832 ||  || — || September 4, 1999 || Kitt Peak || Spacewatch || NYS || align=right data-sort-value="0.99" | 990 m || 
|-id=833 bgcolor=#fefefe
| 129833 ||  || — || September 7, 1999 || Socorro || LINEAR || NYS || align=right | 1.3 km || 
|-id=834 bgcolor=#E9E9E9
| 129834 ||  || — || September 7, 1999 || Socorro || LINEAR || — || align=right | 1.9 km || 
|-id=835 bgcolor=#fefefe
| 129835 ||  || — || September 7, 1999 || Socorro || LINEAR || MAS || align=right | 1.4 km || 
|-id=836 bgcolor=#E9E9E9
| 129836 ||  || — || September 7, 1999 || Socorro || LINEAR || — || align=right | 1.4 km || 
|-id=837 bgcolor=#fefefe
| 129837 ||  || — || September 7, 1999 || Socorro || LINEAR || V || align=right | 1.4 km || 
|-id=838 bgcolor=#fefefe
| 129838 ||  || — || September 7, 1999 || Socorro || LINEAR || — || align=right | 1.8 km || 
|-id=839 bgcolor=#E9E9E9
| 129839 ||  || — || September 7, 1999 || Socorro || LINEAR || RAF || align=right | 1.6 km || 
|-id=840 bgcolor=#E9E9E9
| 129840 ||  || — || September 7, 1999 || Socorro || LINEAR || ADE || align=right | 3.2 km || 
|-id=841 bgcolor=#E9E9E9
| 129841 ||  || — || September 7, 1999 || Socorro || LINEAR || GEF || align=right | 2.9 km || 
|-id=842 bgcolor=#E9E9E9
| 129842 ||  || — || September 7, 1999 || Socorro || LINEAR || — || align=right | 1.3 km || 
|-id=843 bgcolor=#E9E9E9
| 129843 ||  || — || September 7, 1999 || Socorro || LINEAR || — || align=right | 1.6 km || 
|-id=844 bgcolor=#E9E9E9
| 129844 ||  || — || September 7, 1999 || Socorro || LINEAR || — || align=right | 1.8 km || 
|-id=845 bgcolor=#FA8072
| 129845 ||  || — || September 7, 1999 || Socorro || LINEAR || H || align=right | 1.3 km || 
|-id=846 bgcolor=#fefefe
| 129846 ||  || — || September 8, 1999 || Socorro || LINEAR || — || align=right | 1.7 km || 
|-id=847 bgcolor=#fefefe
| 129847 ||  || — || September 13, 1999 || Ondřejov || P. Kušnirák, P. Pravec || — || align=right | 1.9 km || 
|-id=848 bgcolor=#E9E9E9
| 129848 ||  || — || September 7, 1999 || Socorro || LINEAR || — || align=right | 2.0 km || 
|-id=849 bgcolor=#fefefe
| 129849 ||  || — || September 7, 1999 || Socorro || LINEAR || — || align=right | 1.7 km || 
|-id=850 bgcolor=#fefefe
| 129850 ||  || — || September 7, 1999 || Socorro || LINEAR || V || align=right | 1.3 km || 
|-id=851 bgcolor=#fefefe
| 129851 ||  || — || September 7, 1999 || Socorro || LINEAR || — || align=right | 1.6 km || 
|-id=852 bgcolor=#fefefe
| 129852 ||  || — || September 7, 1999 || Socorro || LINEAR || NYS || align=right | 2.0 km || 
|-id=853 bgcolor=#fefefe
| 129853 ||  || — || September 7, 1999 || Socorro || LINEAR || — || align=right | 2.4 km || 
|-id=854 bgcolor=#E9E9E9
| 129854 ||  || — || September 7, 1999 || Socorro || LINEAR || — || align=right | 3.7 km || 
|-id=855 bgcolor=#fefefe
| 129855 ||  || — || September 7, 1999 || Socorro || LINEAR || NYS || align=right | 1.1 km || 
|-id=856 bgcolor=#E9E9E9
| 129856 ||  || — || September 8, 1999 || Socorro || LINEAR || — || align=right | 3.9 km || 
|-id=857 bgcolor=#fefefe
| 129857 ||  || — || September 8, 1999 || Socorro || LINEAR || V || align=right | 1.1 km || 
|-id=858 bgcolor=#E9E9E9
| 129858 ||  || — || September 9, 1999 || Socorro || LINEAR || — || align=right | 4.9 km || 
|-id=859 bgcolor=#fefefe
| 129859 ||  || — || September 9, 1999 || Socorro || LINEAR || ERI || align=right | 2.8 km || 
|-id=860 bgcolor=#fefefe
| 129860 ||  || — || September 9, 1999 || Socorro || LINEAR || V || align=right | 1.5 km || 
|-id=861 bgcolor=#E9E9E9
| 129861 ||  || — || September 9, 1999 || Socorro || LINEAR || — || align=right | 1.9 km || 
|-id=862 bgcolor=#fefefe
| 129862 ||  || — || September 9, 1999 || Socorro || LINEAR || — || align=right | 1.2 km || 
|-id=863 bgcolor=#fefefe
| 129863 ||  || — || September 9, 1999 || Socorro || LINEAR || — || align=right | 4.2 km || 
|-id=864 bgcolor=#fefefe
| 129864 ||  || — || September 9, 1999 || Socorro || LINEAR || — || align=right | 1.4 km || 
|-id=865 bgcolor=#fefefe
| 129865 ||  || — || September 9, 1999 || Socorro || LINEAR || — || align=right | 3.5 km || 
|-id=866 bgcolor=#E9E9E9
| 129866 ||  || — || September 9, 1999 || Socorro || LINEAR || ADE || align=right | 4.5 km || 
|-id=867 bgcolor=#E9E9E9
| 129867 ||  || — || September 9, 1999 || Socorro || LINEAR || — || align=right | 1.6 km || 
|-id=868 bgcolor=#E9E9E9
| 129868 ||  || — || September 9, 1999 || Socorro || LINEAR || — || align=right | 2.9 km || 
|-id=869 bgcolor=#E9E9E9
| 129869 ||  || — || September 9, 1999 || Socorro || LINEAR || MIT || align=right | 4.3 km || 
|-id=870 bgcolor=#E9E9E9
| 129870 ||  || — || September 8, 1999 || Socorro || LINEAR || — || align=right | 5.1 km || 
|-id=871 bgcolor=#fefefe
| 129871 ||  || — || September 8, 1999 || Socorro || LINEAR || — || align=right | 1.8 km || 
|-id=872 bgcolor=#E9E9E9
| 129872 ||  || — || September 8, 1999 || Socorro || LINEAR || — || align=right | 2.7 km || 
|-id=873 bgcolor=#fefefe
| 129873 ||  || — || September 15, 1999 || Uccle || T. Pauwels, S. I. Ipatov || — || align=right | 1.2 km || 
|-id=874 bgcolor=#fefefe
| 129874 ||  || — || September 6, 1999 || Anderson Mesa || LONEOS || NYS || align=right | 1.0 km || 
|-id=875 bgcolor=#E9E9E9
| 129875 ||  || — || September 7, 1999 || Socorro || LINEAR || — || align=right | 1.8 km || 
|-id=876 bgcolor=#fefefe
| 129876 Stevenpeterson ||  ||  || September 4, 1999 || Catalina || CSS || ERI || align=right | 2.4 km || 
|-id=877 bgcolor=#fefefe
| 129877 ||  || — || September 22, 1999 || Socorro || LINEAR || PHO || align=right | 2.3 km || 
|-id=878 bgcolor=#E9E9E9
| 129878 ||  || — || September 21, 1999 || Kleť || Kleť Obs. || EUN || align=right | 2.5 km || 
|-id=879 bgcolor=#E9E9E9
| 129879 Tishasaltzman ||  ||  || September 29, 1999 || Catalina || CSS || — || align=right | 3.1 km || 
|-id=880 bgcolor=#E9E9E9
| 129880 ||  || — || September 28, 1999 || Monte Agliale || M. M. M. Santangelo || AEO || align=right | 2.6 km || 
|-id=881 bgcolor=#fefefe
| 129881 Chucksee ||  ||  || September 29, 1999 || Catalina || CSS || — || align=right | 1.4 km || 
|-id=882 bgcolor=#fefefe
| 129882 Ustica || 1999 TO ||  || October 1, 1999 || Campo Catino || F. Mallia, M. Di Sora || MAS || align=right | 3.2 km || 
|-id=883 bgcolor=#E9E9E9
| 129883 ||  || — || October 2, 1999 || Fountain Hills || C. W. Juels || EUN || align=right | 3.1 km || 
|-id=884 bgcolor=#d6d6d6
| 129884 ||  || — || October 2, 1999 || Ondřejov || L. Kotková || — || align=right | 4.0 km || 
|-id=885 bgcolor=#E9E9E9
| 129885 ||  || — || October 2, 1999 || Socorro || LINEAR || — || align=right | 3.6 km || 
|-id=886 bgcolor=#E9E9E9
| 129886 ||  || — || October 7, 1999 || Višnjan Observatory || K. Korlević, M. Jurić || — || align=right | 3.8 km || 
|-id=887 bgcolor=#E9E9E9
| 129887 ||  || — || October 15, 1999 || Ondřejov || P. Kušnirák, P. Pravec || — || align=right | 2.4 km || 
|-id=888 bgcolor=#fefefe
| 129888 ||  || — || October 3, 1999 || Socorro || LINEAR || H || align=right | 1.2 km || 
|-id=889 bgcolor=#E9E9E9
| 129889 ||  || — || October 3, 1999 || Socorro || LINEAR || — || align=right | 3.3 km || 
|-id=890 bgcolor=#E9E9E9
| 129890 ||  || — || October 4, 1999 || Socorro || LINEAR || — || align=right | 1.4 km || 
|-id=891 bgcolor=#E9E9E9
| 129891 ||  || — || October 4, 1999 || Socorro || LINEAR || — || align=right | 1.9 km || 
|-id=892 bgcolor=#E9E9E9
| 129892 ||  || — || October 2, 1999 || Socorro || LINEAR || — || align=right | 3.4 km || 
|-id=893 bgcolor=#fefefe
| 129893 ||  || — || October 3, 1999 || Socorro || LINEAR || H || align=right | 2.0 km || 
|-id=894 bgcolor=#fefefe
| 129894 ||  || — || October 4, 1999 || Socorro || LINEAR || CIM || align=right | 2.9 km || 
|-id=895 bgcolor=#fefefe
| 129895 ||  || — || October 4, 1999 || Socorro || LINEAR || H || align=right | 1.2 km || 
|-id=896 bgcolor=#E9E9E9
| 129896 ||  || — || October 4, 1999 || Socorro || LINEAR || — || align=right | 4.1 km || 
|-id=897 bgcolor=#E9E9E9
| 129897 ||  || — || October 6, 1999 || Socorro || LINEAR || MAR || align=right | 1.6 km || 
|-id=898 bgcolor=#fefefe
| 129898 Sanfordselznick ||  ||  || October 3, 1999 || Catalina || CSS || H || align=right | 1.1 km || 
|-id=899 bgcolor=#E9E9E9
| 129899 ||  || — || October 2, 1999 || Kitt Peak || Spacewatch || HNS || align=right | 2.5 km || 
|-id=900 bgcolor=#E9E9E9
| 129900 ||  || — || October 3, 1999 || Kitt Peak || Spacewatch || HOF || align=right | 4.1 km || 
|}

129901–130000 

|-bgcolor=#E9E9E9
| 129901 ||  || — || October 6, 1999 || Kitt Peak || Spacewatch || — || align=right | 4.3 km || 
|-id=902 bgcolor=#E9E9E9
| 129902 ||  || — || October 7, 1999 || Kitt Peak || Spacewatch || — || align=right | 2.5 km || 
|-id=903 bgcolor=#E9E9E9
| 129903 ||  || — || October 8, 1999 || Kitt Peak || Spacewatch || — || align=right | 3.5 km || 
|-id=904 bgcolor=#E9E9E9
| 129904 ||  || — || October 9, 1999 || Kitt Peak || Spacewatch || — || align=right | 2.8 km || 
|-id=905 bgcolor=#E9E9E9
| 129905 ||  || — || October 9, 1999 || Kitt Peak || Spacewatch || — || align=right | 1.9 km || 
|-id=906 bgcolor=#E9E9E9
| 129906 ||  || — || October 11, 1999 || Kitt Peak || Spacewatch || — || align=right | 1.7 km || 
|-id=907 bgcolor=#E9E9E9
| 129907 ||  || — || October 11, 1999 || Kitt Peak || Spacewatch || HEN || align=right | 1.5 km || 
|-id=908 bgcolor=#E9E9E9
| 129908 ||  || — || October 2, 1999 || Socorro || LINEAR || — || align=right | 2.4 km || 
|-id=909 bgcolor=#E9E9E9
| 129909 ||  || — || October 2, 1999 || Socorro || LINEAR || — || align=right | 5.4 km || 
|-id=910 bgcolor=#E9E9E9
| 129910 ||  || — || October 2, 1999 || Socorro || LINEAR || — || align=right | 3.2 km || 
|-id=911 bgcolor=#E9E9E9
| 129911 ||  || — || October 2, 1999 || Socorro || LINEAR || JUN || align=right | 2.0 km || 
|-id=912 bgcolor=#E9E9E9
| 129912 ||  || — || October 2, 1999 || Socorro || LINEAR || — || align=right | 4.8 km || 
|-id=913 bgcolor=#fefefe
| 129913 ||  || — || October 2, 1999 || Socorro || LINEAR || V || align=right | 1.6 km || 
|-id=914 bgcolor=#fefefe
| 129914 ||  || — || October 2, 1999 || Socorro || LINEAR || — || align=right | 2.0 km || 
|-id=915 bgcolor=#fefefe
| 129915 ||  || — || October 4, 1999 || Socorro || LINEAR || — || align=right | 2.2 km || 
|-id=916 bgcolor=#E9E9E9
| 129916 ||  || — || October 4, 1999 || Socorro || LINEAR || — || align=right | 2.2 km || 
|-id=917 bgcolor=#fefefe
| 129917 ||  || — || October 4, 1999 || Socorro || LINEAR || — || align=right | 1.8 km || 
|-id=918 bgcolor=#fefefe
| 129918 ||  || — || October 4, 1999 || Socorro || LINEAR || FLO || align=right | 1.3 km || 
|-id=919 bgcolor=#E9E9E9
| 129919 ||  || — || October 4, 1999 || Socorro || LINEAR || — || align=right | 1.5 km || 
|-id=920 bgcolor=#E9E9E9
| 129920 ||  || — || October 4, 1999 || Socorro || LINEAR || — || align=right | 3.0 km || 
|-id=921 bgcolor=#E9E9E9
| 129921 ||  || — || October 4, 1999 || Socorro || LINEAR || — || align=right | 2.5 km || 
|-id=922 bgcolor=#E9E9E9
| 129922 ||  || — || October 4, 1999 || Socorro || LINEAR || — || align=right | 4.4 km || 
|-id=923 bgcolor=#E9E9E9
| 129923 ||  || — || October 4, 1999 || Socorro || LINEAR || MAR || align=right | 1.8 km || 
|-id=924 bgcolor=#E9E9E9
| 129924 ||  || — || October 4, 1999 || Socorro || LINEAR || fast? || align=right | 2.3 km || 
|-id=925 bgcolor=#E9E9E9
| 129925 ||  || — || October 15, 1999 || Socorro || LINEAR || fast? || align=right | 3.0 km || 
|-id=926 bgcolor=#E9E9E9
| 129926 ||  || — || October 4, 1999 || Socorro || LINEAR || KRM || align=right | 4.2 km || 
|-id=927 bgcolor=#E9E9E9
| 129927 ||  || — || October 4, 1999 || Socorro || LINEAR || — || align=right | 1.6 km || 
|-id=928 bgcolor=#E9E9E9
| 129928 ||  || — || October 6, 1999 || Socorro || LINEAR || MRX || align=right | 2.3 km || 
|-id=929 bgcolor=#E9E9E9
| 129929 ||  || — || October 15, 1999 || Socorro || LINEAR || — || align=right | 2.9 km || 
|-id=930 bgcolor=#fefefe
| 129930 ||  || — || October 7, 1999 || Socorro || LINEAR || MAS || align=right | 1.2 km || 
|-id=931 bgcolor=#E9E9E9
| 129931 ||  || — || October 7, 1999 || Socorro || LINEAR || — || align=right | 1.7 km || 
|-id=932 bgcolor=#fefefe
| 129932 ||  || — || October 7, 1999 || Socorro || LINEAR || — || align=right | 3.2 km || 
|-id=933 bgcolor=#d6d6d6
| 129933 ||  || — || October 7, 1999 || Socorro || LINEAR || — || align=right | 3.6 km || 
|-id=934 bgcolor=#E9E9E9
| 129934 ||  || — || October 7, 1999 || Socorro || LINEAR || — || align=right | 3.2 km || 
|-id=935 bgcolor=#E9E9E9
| 129935 ||  || — || October 7, 1999 || Socorro || LINEAR || — || align=right | 6.1 km || 
|-id=936 bgcolor=#E9E9E9
| 129936 ||  || — || October 7, 1999 || Socorro || LINEAR || — || align=right | 2.7 km || 
|-id=937 bgcolor=#E9E9E9
| 129937 ||  || — || October 7, 1999 || Socorro || LINEAR || — || align=right | 2.0 km || 
|-id=938 bgcolor=#E9E9E9
| 129938 ||  || — || October 9, 1999 || Socorro || LINEAR || — || align=right | 1.6 km || 
|-id=939 bgcolor=#E9E9E9
| 129939 ||  || — || October 9, 1999 || Socorro || LINEAR || — || align=right | 1.9 km || 
|-id=940 bgcolor=#fefefe
| 129940 ||  || — || October 10, 1999 || Socorro || LINEAR || V || align=right | 1.2 km || 
|-id=941 bgcolor=#d6d6d6
| 129941 ||  || — || October 10, 1999 || Socorro || LINEAR || KOR || align=right | 2.6 km || 
|-id=942 bgcolor=#E9E9E9
| 129942 ||  || — || October 10, 1999 || Socorro || LINEAR || — || align=right | 3.1 km || 
|-id=943 bgcolor=#E9E9E9
| 129943 ||  || — || October 10, 1999 || Socorro || LINEAR || — || align=right | 1.7 km || 
|-id=944 bgcolor=#E9E9E9
| 129944 ||  || — || October 11, 1999 || Socorro || LINEAR || RAF || align=right | 2.4 km || 
|-id=945 bgcolor=#E9E9E9
| 129945 ||  || — || October 12, 1999 || Socorro || LINEAR || GAL || align=right | 3.0 km || 
|-id=946 bgcolor=#E9E9E9
| 129946 ||  || — || October 12, 1999 || Socorro || LINEAR || — || align=right | 5.5 km || 
|-id=947 bgcolor=#E9E9E9
| 129947 ||  || — || October 12, 1999 || Socorro || LINEAR || — || align=right | 2.1 km || 
|-id=948 bgcolor=#E9E9E9
| 129948 ||  || — || October 15, 1999 || Socorro || LINEAR || ADE || align=right | 3.6 km || 
|-id=949 bgcolor=#fefefe
| 129949 ||  || — || October 15, 1999 || Socorro || LINEAR || — || align=right | 1.9 km || 
|-id=950 bgcolor=#fefefe
| 129950 ||  || — || October 15, 1999 || Socorro || LINEAR || H || align=right data-sort-value="0.79" | 790 m || 
|-id=951 bgcolor=#E9E9E9
| 129951 ||  || — || October 1, 1999 || Kitt Peak || Spacewatch || — || align=right | 3.3 km || 
|-id=952 bgcolor=#fefefe
| 129952 ||  || — || October 1, 1999 || Anderson Mesa || LONEOS || V || align=right | 1.5 km || 
|-id=953 bgcolor=#E9E9E9
| 129953 ||  || — || October 2, 1999 || Kitt Peak || Spacewatch || — || align=right | 3.5 km || 
|-id=954 bgcolor=#E9E9E9
| 129954 Corksauve ||  ||  || October 3, 1999 || Catalina || CSS || — || align=right | 1.6 km || 
|-id=955 bgcolor=#E9E9E9
| 129955 Eriksyrstad ||  ||  || October 8, 1999 || Catalina || CSS || — || align=right | 4.1 km || 
|-id=956 bgcolor=#d6d6d6
| 129956 ||  || — || October 9, 1999 || Kitt Peak || Spacewatch || KOR || align=right | 1.8 km || 
|-id=957 bgcolor=#E9E9E9
| 129957 ||  || — || October 15, 1999 || Socorro || LINEAR || — || align=right | 3.5 km || 
|-id=958 bgcolor=#E9E9E9
| 129958 ||  || — || October 3, 1999 || Socorro || LINEAR || — || align=right | 2.7 km || 
|-id=959 bgcolor=#E9E9E9
| 129959 ||  || — || October 3, 1999 || Socorro || LINEAR || — || align=right | 4.9 km || 
|-id=960 bgcolor=#E9E9E9
| 129960 ||  || — || October 6, 1999 || Socorro || LINEAR || RAF || align=right | 1.6 km || 
|-id=961 bgcolor=#E9E9E9
| 129961 ||  || — || October 10, 1999 || Socorro || LINEAR || — || align=right | 1.5 km || 
|-id=962 bgcolor=#fefefe
| 129962 Williamverts ||  ||  || October 1, 1999 || Catalina || CSS || V || align=right | 1.2 km || 
|-id=963 bgcolor=#fefefe
| 129963 Marvinwalthall ||  ||  || October 2, 1999 || Catalina || CSS || — || align=right | 3.4 km || 
|-id=964 bgcolor=#E9E9E9
| 129964 ||  || — || October 8, 1999 || Kitt Peak || Spacewatch || KON || align=right | 4.0 km || 
|-id=965 bgcolor=#E9E9E9
| 129965 ||  || — || October 29, 1999 || Kitt Peak || Spacewatch || MAR || align=right | 1.4 km || 
|-id=966 bgcolor=#fefefe
| 129966 Michaelward ||  ||  || October 29, 1999 || Catalina || CSS || — || align=right | 1.5 km || 
|-id=967 bgcolor=#fefefe
| 129967 ||  || — || October 31, 1999 || Socorro || LINEAR || H || align=right | 1.3 km || 
|-id=968 bgcolor=#E9E9E9
| 129968 Mitchwhiteley ||  ||  || October 29, 1999 || Catalina || CSS || — || align=right | 4.0 km || 
|-id=969 bgcolor=#E9E9E9
| 129969 Bradwilliams ||  ||  || October 29, 1999 || Catalina || CSS || — || align=right | 2.0 km || 
|-id=970 bgcolor=#E9E9E9
| 129970 ||  || — || October 30, 1999 || Kitt Peak || Spacewatch || — || align=right | 1.7 km || 
|-id=971 bgcolor=#E9E9E9
| 129971 ||  || — || October 31, 1999 || Kitt Peak || Spacewatch || — || align=right | 1.2 km || 
|-id=972 bgcolor=#E9E9E9
| 129972 ||  || — || October 31, 1999 || Kitt Peak || Spacewatch || — || align=right | 2.9 km || 
|-id=973 bgcolor=#E9E9E9
| 129973 Michaeldaly ||  ||  || October 30, 1999 || Catalina || CSS || — || align=right | 3.2 km || 
|-id=974 bgcolor=#E9E9E9
| 129974 ||  || — || October 31, 1999 || Kitt Peak || Spacewatch || AGN || align=right | 1.8 km || 
|-id=975 bgcolor=#E9E9E9
| 129975 ||  || — || October 31, 1999 || Kitt Peak || Spacewatch || — || align=right | 4.4 km || 
|-id=976 bgcolor=#fefefe
| 129976 ||  || — || October 16, 1999 || Kitt Peak || Spacewatch || — || align=right | 1.1 km || 
|-id=977 bgcolor=#E9E9E9
| 129977 ||  || — || October 16, 1999 || Kitt Peak || Spacewatch || — || align=right | 1.4 km || 
|-id=978 bgcolor=#fefefe
| 129978 ||  || — || October 29, 1999 || Anderson Mesa || LONEOS || — || align=right | 2.2 km || 
|-id=979 bgcolor=#E9E9E9
| 129979 ||  || — || October 16, 1999 || Socorro || LINEAR || — || align=right | 2.1 km || 
|-id=980 bgcolor=#fefefe
| 129980 Catherinejohnson ||  ||  || October 28, 1999 || Catalina || CSS || — || align=right | 1.9 km || 
|-id=981 bgcolor=#E9E9E9
| 129981 ||  || — || October 30, 1999 || Kitt Peak || Spacewatch || — || align=right | 1.6 km || 
|-id=982 bgcolor=#E9E9E9
| 129982 Jeffseabrook ||  ||  || October 31, 1999 || Catalina || CSS || MAR || align=right | 2.0 km || 
|-id=983 bgcolor=#fefefe
| 129983 ||  || — || October 30, 1999 || Kitt Peak || Spacewatch || — || align=right | 3.4 km || 
|-id=984 bgcolor=#E9E9E9
| 129984 ||  || — || October 31, 1999 || Anderson Mesa || LONEOS || EUN || align=right | 2.2 km || 
|-id=985 bgcolor=#E9E9E9
| 129985 Jimfreemantle ||  ||  || October 31, 1999 || Catalina || CSS || — || align=right | 3.4 km || 
|-id=986 bgcolor=#E9E9E9
| 129986 ||  || — || October 19, 1999 || Kitt Peak || Spacewatch || — || align=right | 2.0 km || 
|-id=987 bgcolor=#fefefe
| 129987 ||  || — || October 31, 1999 || Catalina || CSS || H || align=right | 1.3 km || 
|-id=988 bgcolor=#E9E9E9
| 129988 Camerondickinson ||  ||  || November 1, 1999 || Catalina || CSS || — || align=right | 3.5 km || 
|-id=989 bgcolor=#FA8072
| 129989 ||  || — || November 5, 1999 || Kitt Peak || Spacewatch || — || align=right | 1.3 km || 
|-id=990 bgcolor=#fefefe
| 129990 ||  || — || November 2, 1999 || Socorro || LINEAR || H || align=right | 1.2 km || 
|-id=991 bgcolor=#fefefe
| 129991 ||  || — || November 2, 1999 || Socorro || LINEAR || H || align=right | 1.1 km || 
|-id=992 bgcolor=#E9E9E9
| 129992 ||  || — || November 2, 1999 || Kitt Peak || Spacewatch || — || align=right | 2.7 km || 
|-id=993 bgcolor=#fefefe
| 129993 ||  || — || November 2, 1999 || Kitt Peak || Spacewatch || — || align=right | 3.2 km || 
|-id=994 bgcolor=#E9E9E9
| 129994 ||  || — || November 2, 1999 || Kitt Peak || Spacewatch || — || align=right | 3.6 km || 
|-id=995 bgcolor=#E9E9E9
| 129995 ||  || — || November 10, 1999 || Višnjan Observatory || K. Korlević || EUN || align=right | 2.3 km || 
|-id=996 bgcolor=#E9E9E9
| 129996 ||  || — || November 13, 1999 || Oizumi || T. Kobayashi || — || align=right | 3.1 km || 
|-id=997 bgcolor=#E9E9E9
| 129997 ||  || — || November 3, 1999 || Socorro || LINEAR || — || align=right | 3.5 km || 
|-id=998 bgcolor=#E9E9E9
| 129998 ||  || — || November 3, 1999 || Socorro || LINEAR || — || align=right | 2.9 km || 
|-id=999 bgcolor=#fefefe
| 129999 ||  || — || November 3, 1999 || Socorro || LINEAR || NYS || align=right | 1.1 km || 
|-id=000 bgcolor=#E9E9E9
| 130000 ||  || — || November 3, 1999 || Socorro || LINEAR || — || align=right | 2.5 km || 
|}

References

External links 
 Discovery Circumstances: Numbered Minor Planets (125001)–(130000) (IAU Minor Planet Center)

0129